

563001–563100 

|-bgcolor=#E9E9E9
| 563001 ||  || — || April 20, 2012 || Mount Lemmon || Mount Lemmon Survey ||  || align=right | 1.9 km || 
|-id=002 bgcolor=#E9E9E9
| 563002 ||  || — || April 21, 2013 || Haleakala || Pan-STARRS ||  || align=right | 1.6 km || 
|-id=003 bgcolor=#E9E9E9
| 563003 ||  || — || January 7, 2016 || Haleakala || Pan-STARRS ||  || align=right | 1.4 km || 
|-id=004 bgcolor=#E9E9E9
| 563004 ||  || — || April 20, 2012 || Mount Lemmon || Mount Lemmon Survey ||  || align=right | 2.0 km || 
|-id=005 bgcolor=#E9E9E9
| 563005 ||  || — || June 14, 2004 || Kitt Peak || Spacewatch ||  || align=right | 2.1 km || 
|-id=006 bgcolor=#E9E9E9
| 563006 ||  || — || November 25, 2005 || Mount Lemmon || Mount Lemmon Survey ||  || align=right | 2.2 km || 
|-id=007 bgcolor=#E9E9E9
| 563007 ||  || — || March 28, 2012 || Kitt Peak || Spacewatch ||  || align=right | 1.7 km || 
|-id=008 bgcolor=#E9E9E9
| 563008 ||  || — || October 1, 2005 || Mount Lemmon || Mount Lemmon Survey ||  || align=right | 1.6 km || 
|-id=009 bgcolor=#E9E9E9
| 563009 ||  || — || January 3, 2016 || Mount Lemmon || Mount Lemmon Survey ||  || align=right | 2.1 km || 
|-id=010 bgcolor=#E9E9E9
| 563010 ||  || — || February 28, 2012 || Haleakala || Pan-STARRS ||  || align=right | 1.8 km || 
|-id=011 bgcolor=#E9E9E9
| 563011 ||  || — || July 7, 2014 || Haleakala || Pan-STARRS ||  || align=right | 1.5 km || 
|-id=012 bgcolor=#E9E9E9
| 563012 ||  || — || April 11, 2008 || Kitt Peak || Spacewatch ||  || align=right | 1.3 km || 
|-id=013 bgcolor=#E9E9E9
| 563013 ||  || — || October 1, 2014 || Haleakala || Pan-STARRS ||  || align=right | 1.9 km || 
|-id=014 bgcolor=#E9E9E9
| 563014 ||  || — || December 21, 2006 || Mount Lemmon || Mount Lemmon Survey ||  || align=right | 1.5 km || 
|-id=015 bgcolor=#d6d6d6
| 563015 ||  || — || September 19, 2014 || Haleakala || Pan-STARRS ||  || align=right | 2.2 km || 
|-id=016 bgcolor=#E9E9E9
| 563016 ||  || — || January 27, 2007 || Mount Lemmon || Mount Lemmon Survey ||  || align=right | 1.6 km || 
|-id=017 bgcolor=#E9E9E9
| 563017 ||  || — || February 21, 2012 || Kitt Peak || Spacewatch ||  || align=right | 1.3 km || 
|-id=018 bgcolor=#E9E9E9
| 563018 ||  || — || January 15, 2016 || Haleakala || Pan-STARRS ||  || align=right | 1.3 km || 
|-id=019 bgcolor=#E9E9E9
| 563019 ||  || — || March 31, 2008 || Kitt Peak || Spacewatch ||  || align=right | 1.4 km || 
|-id=020 bgcolor=#E9E9E9
| 563020 ||  || — || April 14, 2008 || Kitt Peak || Spacewatch ||  || align=right | 1.8 km || 
|-id=021 bgcolor=#E9E9E9
| 563021 ||  || — || September 19, 2009 || Mount Lemmon || Mount Lemmon Survey ||  || align=right | 1.8 km || 
|-id=022 bgcolor=#E9E9E9
| 563022 ||  || — || October 29, 2014 || Haleakala || Pan-STARRS ||  || align=right | 1.2 km || 
|-id=023 bgcolor=#E9E9E9
| 563023 ||  || — || August 27, 2014 || Haleakala || Pan-STARRS ||  || align=right | 1.5 km || 
|-id=024 bgcolor=#E9E9E9
| 563024 ||  || — || September 25, 2005 || Kitt Peak || Spacewatch ||  || align=right | 1.7 km || 
|-id=025 bgcolor=#E9E9E9
| 563025 ||  || — || January 26, 2007 || Kitt Peak || Spacewatch ||  || align=right | 1.8 km || 
|-id=026 bgcolor=#E9E9E9
| 563026 ||  || — || April 8, 2008 || Kitt Peak || Spacewatch ||  || align=right | 1.2 km || 
|-id=027 bgcolor=#E9E9E9
| 563027 ||  || — || October 3, 2014 || Mount Lemmon || Mount Lemmon Survey ||  || align=right | 2.0 km || 
|-id=028 bgcolor=#E9E9E9
| 563028 ||  || — || October 30, 2010 || Kitt Peak || Spacewatch ||  || align=right | 1.4 km || 
|-id=029 bgcolor=#E9E9E9
| 563029 ||  || — || October 29, 2010 || Kitt Peak || Spacewatch ||  || align=right | 1.4 km || 
|-id=030 bgcolor=#E9E9E9
| 563030 ||  || — || November 24, 2006 || Kitt Peak || Spacewatch ||  || align=right | 1.2 km || 
|-id=031 bgcolor=#E9E9E9
| 563031 ||  || — || February 13, 2008 || Mount Lemmon || Mount Lemmon Survey ||  || align=right | 1.1 km || 
|-id=032 bgcolor=#E9E9E9
| 563032 ||  || — || January 3, 2016 || Mount Lemmon || Mount Lemmon Survey ||  || align=right | 1.4 km || 
|-id=033 bgcolor=#E9E9E9
| 563033 ||  || — || March 15, 2012 || Mount Lemmon || Mount Lemmon Survey ||  || align=right | 1.3 km || 
|-id=034 bgcolor=#E9E9E9
| 563034 ||  || — || September 29, 2014 || Haleakala || Pan-STARRS ||  || align=right | 1.3 km || 
|-id=035 bgcolor=#E9E9E9
| 563035 ||  || — || October 8, 2005 || Kitt Peak || Spacewatch ||  || align=right | 1.5 km || 
|-id=036 bgcolor=#E9E9E9
| 563036 ||  || — || July 12, 2005 || Kitt Peak || Spacewatch ||  || align=right | 1.2 km || 
|-id=037 bgcolor=#fefefe
| 563037 ||  || — || May 2, 2013 || Haleakala || Pan-STARRS ||  || align=right data-sort-value="0.94" | 940 m || 
|-id=038 bgcolor=#E9E9E9
| 563038 ||  || — || October 23, 2006 || Mount Lemmon || Mount Lemmon Survey ||  || align=right | 2.1 km || 
|-id=039 bgcolor=#E9E9E9
| 563039 ||  || — || November 2, 2010 || Kitt Peak || Spacewatch ||  || align=right | 1.8 km || 
|-id=040 bgcolor=#E9E9E9
| 563040 ||  || — || October 1, 2005 || Mount Lemmon || Mount Lemmon Survey ||  || align=right | 1.8 km || 
|-id=041 bgcolor=#E9E9E9
| 563041 ||  || — || November 22, 2006 || Mount Lemmon || Mount Lemmon Survey ||  || align=right | 1.3 km || 
|-id=042 bgcolor=#E9E9E9
| 563042 ||  || — || January 31, 2016 || Mount Lemmon || Mount Lemmon Survey ||  || align=right | 1.8 km || 
|-id=043 bgcolor=#E9E9E9
| 563043 ||  || — || October 4, 2014 || Mount Lemmon || Mount Lemmon Survey ||  || align=right | 2.0 km || 
|-id=044 bgcolor=#E9E9E9
| 563044 ||  || — || November 24, 2006 || Kitt Peak || Spacewatch ||  || align=right | 1.3 km || 
|-id=045 bgcolor=#E9E9E9
| 563045 ||  || — || October 17, 2010 || Mount Lemmon || Mount Lemmon Survey ||  || align=right | 1.9 km || 
|-id=046 bgcolor=#E9E9E9
| 563046 ||  || — || March 16, 2012 || Kitt Peak || Spacewatch ||  || align=right | 1.6 km || 
|-id=047 bgcolor=#E9E9E9
| 563047 ||  || — || January 29, 2016 || Mount Lemmon || Mount Lemmon Survey ||  || align=right data-sort-value="0.93" | 930 m || 
|-id=048 bgcolor=#E9E9E9
| 563048 ||  || — || January 2, 2012 || Mount Lemmon || Mount Lemmon Survey ||  || align=right | 2.1 km || 
|-id=049 bgcolor=#E9E9E9
| 563049 ||  || — || October 29, 2005 || Kitt Peak || Spacewatch ||  || align=right | 1.9 km || 
|-id=050 bgcolor=#E9E9E9
| 563050 ||  || — || February 7, 2002 || Kitt Peak || Spacewatch ||  || align=right | 2.2 km || 
|-id=051 bgcolor=#E9E9E9
| 563051 ||  || — || August 4, 2005 || Palomar || NEAT ||  || align=right | 1.7 km || 
|-id=052 bgcolor=#E9E9E9
| 563052 ||  || — || March 14, 2012 || Mount Lemmon || Mount Lemmon Survey ||  || align=right | 1.4 km || 
|-id=053 bgcolor=#E9E9E9
| 563053 ||  || — || March 13, 2012 || Mount Lemmon || Mount Lemmon Survey ||  || align=right | 1.4 km || 
|-id=054 bgcolor=#d6d6d6
| 563054 ||  || — || September 14, 2014 || Kitt Peak || Spacewatch ||  || align=right | 2.5 km || 
|-id=055 bgcolor=#E9E9E9
| 563055 ||  || — || November 6, 2005 || Kitt Peak || Spacewatch ||  || align=right | 1.8 km || 
|-id=056 bgcolor=#E9E9E9
| 563056 ||  || — || June 18, 2013 || Haleakala || Pan-STARRS ||  || align=right | 1.8 km || 
|-id=057 bgcolor=#E9E9E9
| 563057 ||  || — || August 25, 2014 || Haleakala || Pan-STARRS ||  || align=right | 1.0 km || 
|-id=058 bgcolor=#E9E9E9
| 563058 ||  || — || October 2, 2014 || Haleakala || Pan-STARRS ||  || align=right | 1.8 km || 
|-id=059 bgcolor=#E9E9E9
| 563059 ||  || — || November 1, 2014 || Mount Lemmon || Mount Lemmon Survey ||  || align=right | 1.9 km || 
|-id=060 bgcolor=#E9E9E9
| 563060 ||  || — || February 24, 2007 || Nyukasa || H. Kurosaki, A. Nakajima ||  || align=right | 1.9 km || 
|-id=061 bgcolor=#E9E9E9
| 563061 ||  || — || February 19, 2002 || Kitt Peak || Spacewatch ||  || align=right | 1.6 km || 
|-id=062 bgcolor=#fefefe
| 563062 ||  || — || January 31, 2016 || Haleakala || Pan-STARRS ||  || align=right data-sort-value="0.61" | 610 m || 
|-id=063 bgcolor=#E9E9E9
| 563063 ||  || — || January 8, 2016 || Haleakala || Pan-STARRS ||  || align=right data-sort-value="0.87" | 870 m || 
|-id=064 bgcolor=#E9E9E9
| 563064 ||  || — || December 13, 2006 || Kitt Peak || Spacewatch ||  || align=right | 1.3 km || 
|-id=065 bgcolor=#E9E9E9
| 563065 ||  || — || October 2, 2014 || Haleakala || Pan-STARRS ||  || align=right | 2.0 km || 
|-id=066 bgcolor=#E9E9E9
| 563066 ||  || — || April 5, 2008 || Kitt Peak || Spacewatch ||  || align=right | 1.3 km || 
|-id=067 bgcolor=#E9E9E9
| 563067 ||  || — || September 30, 2005 || Kitt Peak || Spacewatch ||  || align=right | 1.3 km || 
|-id=068 bgcolor=#E9E9E9
| 563068 ||  || — || June 14, 2004 || Kitt Peak || Spacewatch ||  || align=right | 3.2 km || 
|-id=069 bgcolor=#d6d6d6
| 563069 ||  || — || December 29, 2014 || Haleakala || Pan-STARRS ||  || align=right | 2.7 km || 
|-id=070 bgcolor=#fefefe
| 563070 ||  || — || January 31, 2016 || Haleakala || Pan-STARRS || H || align=right data-sort-value="0.58" | 580 m || 
|-id=071 bgcolor=#FA8072
| 563071 ||  || — || January 18, 2016 || Haleakala || Pan-STARRS || H || align=right data-sort-value="0.48" | 480 m || 
|-id=072 bgcolor=#fefefe
| 563072 ||  || — || April 27, 2011 || Socorro || LINEAR || H || align=right data-sort-value="0.63" | 630 m || 
|-id=073 bgcolor=#E9E9E9
| 563073 ||  || — || January 27, 2007 || Mount Lemmon || Mount Lemmon Survey ||  || align=right | 2.0 km || 
|-id=074 bgcolor=#E9E9E9
| 563074 ||  || — || November 25, 2005 || Kitt Peak || Spacewatch ||  || align=right | 2.0 km || 
|-id=075 bgcolor=#d6d6d6
| 563075 ||  || — || September 22, 2009 || Mount Lemmon || Mount Lemmon Survey ||  || align=right | 1.7 km || 
|-id=076 bgcolor=#E9E9E9
| 563076 ||  || — || January 16, 2016 || Haleakala || Pan-STARRS ||  || align=right | 1.5 km || 
|-id=077 bgcolor=#E9E9E9
| 563077 ||  || — || March 12, 2007 || Mount Lemmon || Mount Lemmon Survey ||  || align=right | 1.6 km || 
|-id=078 bgcolor=#E9E9E9
| 563078 ||  || — || January 10, 2007 || Mount Lemmon || Mount Lemmon Survey ||  || align=right | 1.1 km || 
|-id=079 bgcolor=#E9E9E9
| 563079 ||  || — || March 20, 2007 || Mount Lemmon || Mount Lemmon Survey ||  || align=right | 1.7 km || 
|-id=080 bgcolor=#E9E9E9
| 563080 ||  || — || August 15, 2009 || Kitt Peak || Spacewatch ||  || align=right | 2.0 km || 
|-id=081 bgcolor=#E9E9E9
| 563081 ||  || — || October 1, 2014 || Haleakala || Pan-STARRS ||  || align=right data-sort-value="0.98" | 980 m || 
|-id=082 bgcolor=#E9E9E9
| 563082 ||  || — || January 10, 2007 || Mount Lemmon || Mount Lemmon Survey ||  || align=right | 2.0 km || 
|-id=083 bgcolor=#d6d6d6
| 563083 ||  || — || September 13, 2007 || Catalina || CSS ||  || align=right | 3.7 km || 
|-id=084 bgcolor=#E9E9E9
| 563084 ||  || — || February 10, 2011 || Mount Lemmon || Mount Lemmon Survey ||  || align=right | 1.5 km || 
|-id=085 bgcolor=#d6d6d6
| 563085 ||  || — || May 6, 2006 || Kitt Peak || Spacewatch ||  || align=right | 2.5 km || 
|-id=086 bgcolor=#E9E9E9
| 563086 ||  || — || October 17, 2010 || Mount Lemmon || Mount Lemmon Survey ||  || align=right | 1.3 km || 
|-id=087 bgcolor=#d6d6d6
| 563087 ||  || — || August 31, 2013 || Haleakala || Pan-STARRS ||  || align=right | 2.6 km || 
|-id=088 bgcolor=#d6d6d6
| 563088 ||  || — || May 21, 2011 || Mount Lemmon || Mount Lemmon Survey ||  || align=right | 3.6 km || 
|-id=089 bgcolor=#E9E9E9
| 563089 ||  || — || December 1, 2010 || Mount Lemmon || Mount Lemmon Survey ||  || align=right | 1.3 km || 
|-id=090 bgcolor=#E9E9E9
| 563090 ||  || — || August 3, 2014 || Haleakala || Pan-STARRS ||  || align=right data-sort-value="0.93" | 930 m || 
|-id=091 bgcolor=#d6d6d6
| 563091 ||  || — || November 28, 2005 || Mount Lemmon || Mount Lemmon Survey ||  || align=right | 2.6 km || 
|-id=092 bgcolor=#d6d6d6
| 563092 ||  || — || January 16, 2016 || Haleakala || Pan-STARRS ||  || align=right | 2.3 km || 
|-id=093 bgcolor=#d6d6d6
| 563093 ||  || — || January 17, 2016 || Haleakala || Pan-STARRS ||  || align=right | 2.6 km || 
|-id=094 bgcolor=#E9E9E9
| 563094 ||  || — || March 27, 2012 || Kitt Peak || Spacewatch ||  || align=right | 1.5 km || 
|-id=095 bgcolor=#E9E9E9
| 563095 ||  || — || January 18, 2016 || Haleakala || Pan-STARRS ||  || align=right | 2.1 km || 
|-id=096 bgcolor=#E9E9E9
| 563096 ||  || — || October 1, 2014 || Haleakala || Pan-STARRS ||  || align=right | 2.3 km || 
|-id=097 bgcolor=#d6d6d6
| 563097 ||  || — || September 28, 2008 || Catalina || CSS ||  || align=right | 2.9 km || 
|-id=098 bgcolor=#d6d6d6
| 563098 ||  || — || August 26, 2013 || Haleakala || Pan-STARRS ||  || align=right | 3.1 km || 
|-id=099 bgcolor=#d6d6d6
| 563099 ||  || — || April 1, 2011 || Kitt Peak || Spacewatch ||  || align=right | 2.3 km || 
|-id=100 bgcolor=#E9E9E9
| 563100 ||  || — || January 30, 2012 || Mount Lemmon || Mount Lemmon Survey ||  || align=right data-sort-value="0.75" | 750 m || 
|}

563101–563200 

|-bgcolor=#E9E9E9
| 563101 ||  || — || October 21, 2006 || Kitt Peak || Spacewatch ||  || align=right data-sort-value="0.76" | 760 m || 
|-id=102 bgcolor=#E9E9E9
| 563102 ||  || — || November 2, 2010 || Mount Lemmon || Mount Lemmon Survey ||  || align=right | 1.7 km || 
|-id=103 bgcolor=#E9E9E9
| 563103 ||  || — || April 11, 2007 || Kitt Peak || Spacewatch ||  || align=right | 1.8 km || 
|-id=104 bgcolor=#d6d6d6
| 563104 ||  || — || April 2, 2011 || Kitt Peak || Pan-STARRS ||  || align=right | 3.2 km || 
|-id=105 bgcolor=#d6d6d6
| 563105 ||  || — || March 11, 2005 || Kitt Peak || Spacewatch ||  || align=right | 3.4 km || 
|-id=106 bgcolor=#d6d6d6
| 563106 ||  || — || November 28, 2014 || Mount Lemmon || Mount Lemmon Survey ||  || align=right | 3.3 km || 
|-id=107 bgcolor=#E9E9E9
| 563107 ||  || — || February 4, 2012 || Haleakala || Pan-STARRS ||  || align=right data-sort-value="0.90" | 900 m || 
|-id=108 bgcolor=#E9E9E9
| 563108 ||  || — || November 28, 2014 || Haleakala || Pan-STARRS ||  || align=right | 1.7 km || 
|-id=109 bgcolor=#d6d6d6
| 563109 ||  || — || December 19, 2009 || Kitt Peak || Spacewatch ||  || align=right | 2.7 km || 
|-id=110 bgcolor=#d6d6d6
| 563110 ||  || — || January 17, 2016 || Haleakala || Pan-STARRS ||  || align=right | 2.9 km || 
|-id=111 bgcolor=#d6d6d6
| 563111 ||  || — || October 23, 2008 || Kitt Peak || Spacewatch ||  || align=right | 2.8 km || 
|-id=112 bgcolor=#d6d6d6
| 563112 ||  || — || October 26, 2008 || Kitt Peak || Spacewatch ||  || align=right | 3.1 km || 
|-id=113 bgcolor=#d6d6d6
| 563113 ||  || — || January 17, 2016 || Haleakala || Pan-STARRS ||  || align=right | 2.9 km || 
|-id=114 bgcolor=#d6d6d6
| 563114 ||  || — || January 7, 2010 || Kitt Peak || Spacewatch ||  || align=right | 2.2 km || 
|-id=115 bgcolor=#d6d6d6
| 563115 ||  || — || November 27, 2014 || Mount Lemmon || Mount Lemmon Survey ||  || align=right | 2.2 km || 
|-id=116 bgcolor=#E9E9E9
| 563116 ||  || — || August 22, 2014 || Haleakala || Pan-STARRS ||  || align=right data-sort-value="0.68" | 680 m || 
|-id=117 bgcolor=#E9E9E9
| 563117 ||  || — || September 2, 2014 || Haleakala || Pan-STARRS ||  || align=right data-sort-value="0.84" | 840 m || 
|-id=118 bgcolor=#E9E9E9
| 563118 ||  || — || November 6, 2005 || Kitt Peak || Spacewatch ||  || align=right | 1.9 km || 
|-id=119 bgcolor=#d6d6d6
| 563119 ||  || — || December 20, 2014 || Haleakala || Pan-STARRS ||  || align=right | 2.3 km || 
|-id=120 bgcolor=#d6d6d6
| 563120 ||  || — || October 21, 2014 || Mount Lemmon || Mount Lemmon Survey ||  || align=right | 1.7 km || 
|-id=121 bgcolor=#E9E9E9
| 563121 ||  || — || November 17, 2014 || Haleakala || Pan-STARRS ||  || align=right | 2.1 km || 
|-id=122 bgcolor=#d6d6d6
| 563122 ||  || — || July 31, 2011 || Haleakala || Pan-STARRS || Tj (2.99) || align=right | 3.0 km || 
|-id=123 bgcolor=#E9E9E9
| 563123 ||  || — || August 23, 2014 || Haleakala || Pan-STARRS ||  || align=right | 1.7 km || 
|-id=124 bgcolor=#E9E9E9
| 563124 ||  || — || March 15, 2012 || Mount Lemmon || Mount Lemmon Survey ||  || align=right | 1.2 km || 
|-id=125 bgcolor=#E9E9E9
| 563125 ||  || — || September 18, 2014 || Haleakala || Pan-STARRS ||  || align=right data-sort-value="0.95" | 950 m || 
|-id=126 bgcolor=#E9E9E9
| 563126 ||  || — || October 14, 2014 || Kitt Peak || Spacewatch ||  || align=right | 1.8 km || 
|-id=127 bgcolor=#E9E9E9
| 563127 ||  || — || January 31, 2016 || Mount Lemmon || Mount Lemmon Survey ||  || align=right | 1.2 km || 
|-id=128 bgcolor=#E9E9E9
| 563128 ||  || — || January 31, 2016 || Haleakala || Pan-STARRS ||  || align=right | 1.6 km || 
|-id=129 bgcolor=#d6d6d6
| 563129 ||  || — || January 18, 2016 || Haleakala || Pan-STARRS ||  || align=right | 2.2 km || 
|-id=130 bgcolor=#d6d6d6
| 563130 ||  || — || January 17, 2016 || Haleakala || Pan-STARRS ||  || align=right | 2.0 km || 
|-id=131 bgcolor=#d6d6d6
| 563131 ||  || — || January 18, 2016 || Haleakala || Pan-STARRS ||  || align=right | 2.1 km || 
|-id=132 bgcolor=#E9E9E9
| 563132 ||  || — || July 1, 2005 || Kitt Peak || Spacewatch ||  || align=right | 2.1 km || 
|-id=133 bgcolor=#E9E9E9
| 563133 ||  || — || January 5, 2002 || Kitt Peak || Spacewatch ||  || align=right | 1.6 km || 
|-id=134 bgcolor=#E9E9E9
| 563134 ||  || — || March 29, 2012 || Haleakala || Pan-STARRS ||  || align=right | 1.2 km || 
|-id=135 bgcolor=#E9E9E9
| 563135 ||  || — || March 25, 2012 || Mount Lemmon || Mount Lemmon Survey ||  || align=right | 2.3 km || 
|-id=136 bgcolor=#E9E9E9
| 563136 ||  || — || January 28, 2007 || Mount Lemmon || Mount Lemmon Survey ||  || align=right | 1.8 km || 
|-id=137 bgcolor=#E9E9E9
| 563137 ||  || — || January 10, 2007 || Mount Lemmon || Mount Lemmon Survey ||  || align=right | 1.3 km || 
|-id=138 bgcolor=#E9E9E9
| 563138 ||  || — || August 17, 2009 || Kitt Peak || Spacewatch ||  || align=right | 2.0 km || 
|-id=139 bgcolor=#E9E9E9
| 563139 ||  || — || February 21, 2012 || Mount Lemmon || Mount Lemmon Survey ||  || align=right | 1.6 km || 
|-id=140 bgcolor=#E9E9E9
| 563140 ||  || — || September 22, 2009 || Catalina || CSS ||  || align=right | 2.0 km || 
|-id=141 bgcolor=#E9E9E9
| 563141 ||  || — || September 15, 2009 || Kitt Peak || Spacewatch ||  || align=right | 2.2 km || 
|-id=142 bgcolor=#E9E9E9
| 563142 ||  || — || February 16, 2007 || Charleston || R. Holmes ||  || align=right | 2.4 km || 
|-id=143 bgcolor=#E9E9E9
| 563143 ||  || — || September 19, 2014 || Haleakala || Pan-STARRS ||  || align=right | 1.9 km || 
|-id=144 bgcolor=#E9E9E9
| 563144 ||  || — || August 20, 2009 || La Sagra || OAM Obs. ||  || align=right | 2.6 km || 
|-id=145 bgcolor=#d6d6d6
| 563145 ||  || — || February 27, 2006 || Mount Lemmon || Mount Lemmon Survey ||  || align=right | 1.7 km || 
|-id=146 bgcolor=#E9E9E9
| 563146 ||  || — || October 25, 2001 || Apache Point || SDSS Collaboration ||  || align=right | 1.3 km || 
|-id=147 bgcolor=#E9E9E9
| 563147 ||  || — || January 19, 2007 || Mauna Kea || Mauna Kea Obs. ||  || align=right | 1.1 km || 
|-id=148 bgcolor=#E9E9E9
| 563148 ||  || — || February 8, 2002 || Kitt Peak || Spacewatch ||  || align=right | 2.1 km || 
|-id=149 bgcolor=#E9E9E9
| 563149 ||  || — || July 29, 2009 || Kitt Peak || Spacewatch ||  || align=right | 1.9 km || 
|-id=150 bgcolor=#E9E9E9
| 563150 ||  || — || November 6, 2005 || Mount Lemmon || Mount Lemmon Survey ||  || align=right | 2.2 km || 
|-id=151 bgcolor=#E9E9E9
| 563151 ||  || — || February 9, 2008 || Kitt Peak || Spacewatch ||  || align=right | 1.2 km || 
|-id=152 bgcolor=#fefefe
| 563152 ||  || — || December 8, 2015 || Haleakala || Pan-STARRS || H || align=right data-sort-value="0.61" | 610 m || 
|-id=153 bgcolor=#E9E9E9
| 563153 ||  || — || October 28, 2014 || Haleakala || Pan-STARRS ||  || align=right | 1.9 km || 
|-id=154 bgcolor=#E9E9E9
| 563154 ||  || — || March 11, 2008 || Kitt Peak || Spacewatch ||  || align=right data-sort-value="0.94" | 940 m || 
|-id=155 bgcolor=#E9E9E9
| 563155 ||  || — || April 11, 2008 || Kitt Peak || Spacewatch ||  || align=right | 1.4 km || 
|-id=156 bgcolor=#E9E9E9
| 563156 ||  || — || November 1, 2005 || Kitt Peak || Spacewatch ||  || align=right | 1.7 km || 
|-id=157 bgcolor=#E9E9E9
| 563157 ||  || — || July 28, 2014 || Haleakala || Pan-STARRS ||  || align=right | 1.3 km || 
|-id=158 bgcolor=#d6d6d6
| 563158 ||  || — || January 28, 2000 || Kitt Peak || Spacewatch ||  || align=right | 3.2 km || 
|-id=159 bgcolor=#E9E9E9
| 563159 ||  || — || February 27, 2012 || Kitt Peak || Spacewatch ||  || align=right | 1.0 km || 
|-id=160 bgcolor=#E9E9E9
| 563160 ||  || — || December 6, 2015 || Haleakala || Pan-STARRS ||  || align=right | 1.9 km || 
|-id=161 bgcolor=#d6d6d6
| 563161 ||  || — || September 23, 2014 || Haleakala || Pan-STARRS ||  || align=right | 2.7 km || 
|-id=162 bgcolor=#E9E9E9
| 563162 ||  || — || March 28, 2012 || Kitt Peak || Spacewatch ||  || align=right | 2.1 km || 
|-id=163 bgcolor=#E9E9E9
| 563163 ||  || — || August 29, 2009 || Bergisch Gladbach || W. Bickel ||  || align=right | 2.0 km || 
|-id=164 bgcolor=#E9E9E9
| 563164 ||  || — || September 10, 2010 || Front Royal || D. R. Skillman ||  || align=right data-sort-value="0.91" | 910 m || 
|-id=165 bgcolor=#E9E9E9
| 563165 ||  || — || January 8, 1999 || Kitt Peak || Spacewatch ||  || align=right | 1.1 km || 
|-id=166 bgcolor=#E9E9E9
| 563166 ||  || — || September 1, 2005 || Palomar || NEAT ||  || align=right | 1.8 km || 
|-id=167 bgcolor=#E9E9E9
| 563167 ||  || — || January 27, 2007 || Mount Lemmon || Mount Lemmon Survey ||  || align=right | 1.7 km || 
|-id=168 bgcolor=#E9E9E9
| 563168 ||  || — || October 29, 2005 || Kitt Peak || Spacewatch ||  || align=right | 2.0 km || 
|-id=169 bgcolor=#d6d6d6
| 563169 ||  || — || September 30, 2009 || Mount Lemmon || Mount Lemmon Survey ||  || align=right | 3.1 km || 
|-id=170 bgcolor=#E9E9E9
| 563170 ||  || — || August 3, 2014 || Haleakala || Pan-STARRS ||  || align=right | 1.1 km || 
|-id=171 bgcolor=#E9E9E9
| 563171 ||  || — || August 23, 2014 || Haleakala || Pan-STARRS ||  || align=right | 2.1 km || 
|-id=172 bgcolor=#E9E9E9
| 563172 ||  || — || December 13, 2006 || Kitt Peak || Spacewatch ||  || align=right | 1.1 km || 
|-id=173 bgcolor=#E9E9E9
| 563173 ||  || — || January 13, 2016 || Haleakala || Pan-STARRS ||  || align=right | 1.5 km || 
|-id=174 bgcolor=#d6d6d6
| 563174 ||  || — || April 20, 2006 || Kitt Peak || Spacewatch ||  || align=right | 3.6 km || 
|-id=175 bgcolor=#E9E9E9
| 563175 ||  || — || September 27, 2005 || Palomar || NEAT ||  || align=right | 2.2 km || 
|-id=176 bgcolor=#fefefe
| 563176 ||  || — || February 6, 2016 || Mount Lemmon || Mount Lemmon Survey || H || align=right data-sort-value="0.54" | 540 m || 
|-id=177 bgcolor=#d6d6d6
| 563177 ||  || — || July 29, 2008 || Mount Lemmon || Mount Lemmon Survey ||  || align=right | 2.6 km || 
|-id=178 bgcolor=#E9E9E9
| 563178 ||  || — || September 30, 2005 || Mount Lemmon || Mount Lemmon Survey ||  || align=right | 1.7 km || 
|-id=179 bgcolor=#E9E9E9
| 563179 ||  || — || October 17, 2010 || Mount Lemmon || Mount Lemmon Survey ||  || align=right | 1.4 km || 
|-id=180 bgcolor=#E9E9E9
| 563180 ||  || — || November 1, 2014 || Mount Lemmon || Mount Lemmon Survey ||  || align=right | 2.4 km || 
|-id=181 bgcolor=#E9E9E9
| 563181 ||  || — || February 20, 2012 || Haleakala || Pan-STARRS ||  || align=right | 1.4 km || 
|-id=182 bgcolor=#E9E9E9
| 563182 ||  || — || November 27, 2006 || Mount Lemmon || Mount Lemmon Survey ||  || align=right | 1.6 km || 
|-id=183 bgcolor=#E9E9E9
| 563183 ||  || — || October 9, 2010 || Mount Lemmon || Mount Lemmon Survey ||  || align=right data-sort-value="0.95" | 950 m || 
|-id=184 bgcolor=#E9E9E9
| 563184 ||  || — || December 25, 2010 || Kitt Peak || Spacewatch ||  || align=right | 1.6 km || 
|-id=185 bgcolor=#d6d6d6
| 563185 ||  || — || March 6, 2011 || Mount Lemmon || Mount Lemmon Survey ||  || align=right | 1.9 km || 
|-id=186 bgcolor=#E9E9E9
| 563186 ||  || — || September 20, 2014 || Haleakala || Pan-STARRS ||  || align=right | 1.3 km || 
|-id=187 bgcolor=#E9E9E9
| 563187 ||  || — || November 25, 2010 || Mount Lemmon || Mount Lemmon Survey ||  || align=right | 1.2 km || 
|-id=188 bgcolor=#E9E9E9
| 563188 ||  || — || August 15, 2009 || Kitt Peak || Spacewatch ||  || align=right | 2.3 km || 
|-id=189 bgcolor=#E9E9E9
| 563189 ||  || — || January 7, 2016 || Haleakala || Pan-STARRS ||  || align=right | 1.5 km || 
|-id=190 bgcolor=#E9E9E9
| 563190 ||  || — || August 30, 2005 || Kitt Peak || Spacewatch ||  || align=right | 1.7 km || 
|-id=191 bgcolor=#fefefe
| 563191 ||  || — || August 30, 2014 || Haleakala || Pan-STARRS ||  || align=right data-sort-value="0.94" | 940 m || 
|-id=192 bgcolor=#d6d6d6
| 563192 ||  || — || September 20, 2014 || Haleakala || Pan-STARRS ||  || align=right | 2.0 km || 
|-id=193 bgcolor=#E9E9E9
| 563193 ||  || — || January 27, 2007 || Kitt Peak || Spacewatch ||  || align=right | 1.8 km || 
|-id=194 bgcolor=#E9E9E9
| 563194 ||  || — || November 1, 2014 || Mount Lemmon || Mount Lemmon Survey ||  || align=right | 2.1 km || 
|-id=195 bgcolor=#E9E9E9
| 563195 ||  || — || August 19, 2014 || Haleakala || Pan-STARRS ||  || align=right | 1.7 km || 
|-id=196 bgcolor=#E9E9E9
| 563196 ||  || — || November 4, 2005 || Mount Lemmon || Mount Lemmon Survey ||  || align=right | 1.7 km || 
|-id=197 bgcolor=#E9E9E9
| 563197 ||  || — || April 12, 2012 || Haleakala || Pan-STARRS ||  || align=right | 1.7 km || 
|-id=198 bgcolor=#E9E9E9
| 563198 ||  || — || January 14, 2002 || Palomar || NEAT ||  || align=right | 1.5 km || 
|-id=199 bgcolor=#d6d6d6
| 563199 ||  || — || January 11, 2011 || Kitt Peak || Spacewatch ||  || align=right | 1.8 km || 
|-id=200 bgcolor=#E9E9E9
| 563200 ||  || — || February 8, 2007 || Kitt Peak || Spacewatch ||  || align=right | 2.0 km || 
|}

563201–563300 

|-bgcolor=#E9E9E9
| 563201 ||  || — || November 12, 2005 || Kitt Peak || Spacewatch ||  || align=right | 1.9 km || 
|-id=202 bgcolor=#E9E9E9
| 563202 ||  || — || August 27, 2005 || Palomar || NEAT ||  || align=right | 1.3 km || 
|-id=203 bgcolor=#E9E9E9
| 563203 ||  || — || January 14, 2016 || Haleakala || Pan-STARRS ||  || align=right | 1.1 km || 
|-id=204 bgcolor=#d6d6d6
| 563204 ||  || — || September 19, 2014 || Haleakala || Pan-STARRS ||  || align=right | 1.7 km || 
|-id=205 bgcolor=#E9E9E9
| 563205 ||  || — || February 28, 2012 || Haleakala || Pan-STARRS ||  || align=right | 1.8 km || 
|-id=206 bgcolor=#E9E9E9
| 563206 ||  || — || June 18, 2013 || Haleakala || Pan-STARRS ||  || align=right | 1.5 km || 
|-id=207 bgcolor=#E9E9E9
| 563207 ||  || — || September 15, 2009 || Kitt Peak || Spacewatch ||  || align=right | 2.1 km || 
|-id=208 bgcolor=#E9E9E9
| 563208 ||  || — || November 25, 2005 || Kitt Peak || Spacewatch ||  || align=right | 1.9 km || 
|-id=209 bgcolor=#E9E9E9
| 563209 ||  || — || September 27, 2009 || Mount Lemmon || Mount Lemmon Survey ||  || align=right | 1.6 km || 
|-id=210 bgcolor=#E9E9E9
| 563210 ||  || — || January 17, 2007 || Catalina || CSS ||  || align=right | 1.8 km || 
|-id=211 bgcolor=#E9E9E9
| 563211 ||  || — || August 28, 2014 || Haleakala || Pan-STARRS ||  || align=right data-sort-value="0.75" | 750 m || 
|-id=212 bgcolor=#d6d6d6
| 563212 ||  || — || July 14, 2013 || Haleakala || Pan-STARRS ||  || align=right | 3.2 km || 
|-id=213 bgcolor=#E9E9E9
| 563213 ||  || — || January 9, 2016 || Haleakala || Pan-STARRS ||  || align=right | 1.9 km || 
|-id=214 bgcolor=#E9E9E9
| 563214 ||  || — || February 26, 2012 || Kitt Peak || Spacewatch ||  || align=right | 1.3 km || 
|-id=215 bgcolor=#d6d6d6
| 563215 ||  || — || May 27, 2012 || Mount Lemmon || Mount Lemmon Survey ||  || align=right | 2.3 km || 
|-id=216 bgcolor=#E9E9E9
| 563216 ||  || — || October 29, 2014 || Haleakala || Pan-STARRS ||  || align=right | 1.2 km || 
|-id=217 bgcolor=#E9E9E9
| 563217 ||  || — || September 29, 2005 || Mount Lemmon || Mount Lemmon Survey ||  || align=right | 1.7 km || 
|-id=218 bgcolor=#E9E9E9
| 563218 ||  || — || April 13, 2012 || Haleakala || Pan-STARRS ||  || align=right | 1.6 km || 
|-id=219 bgcolor=#fefefe
| 563219 ||  || — || October 12, 2007 || Mount Lemmon || Mount Lemmon Survey ||  || align=right data-sort-value="0.61" | 610 m || 
|-id=220 bgcolor=#E9E9E9
| 563220 ||  || — || June 18, 2013 || Haleakala || Pan-STARRS ||  || align=right | 1.7 km || 
|-id=221 bgcolor=#E9E9E9
| 563221 ||  || — || November 7, 2010 || Mount Lemmon || Mount Lemmon Survey ||  || align=right | 1.4 km || 
|-id=222 bgcolor=#E9E9E9
| 563222 ||  || — || January 14, 2011 || Mount Lemmon || Mount Lemmon Survey ||  || align=right | 2.4 km || 
|-id=223 bgcolor=#E9E9E9
| 563223 ||  || — || September 20, 2009 || Mount Lemmon || Mount Lemmon Survey ||  || align=right | 2.4 km || 
|-id=224 bgcolor=#E9E9E9
| 563224 ||  || — || June 21, 2009 || Mount Lemmon || Mount Lemmon Survey ||  || align=right | 1.7 km || 
|-id=225 bgcolor=#E9E9E9
| 563225 ||  || — || January 3, 2016 || Haleakala || Pan-STARRS ||  || align=right | 1.5 km || 
|-id=226 bgcolor=#E9E9E9
| 563226 ||  || — || January 8, 2016 || Haleakala || Pan-STARRS ||  || align=right | 1.8 km || 
|-id=227 bgcolor=#E9E9E9
| 563227 ||  || — || January 10, 2007 || Kitt Peak || Spacewatch ||  || align=right | 1.3 km || 
|-id=228 bgcolor=#E9E9E9
| 563228 ||  || — || April 16, 2008 || Mount Lemmon || Mount Lemmon Survey ||  || align=right | 1.4 km || 
|-id=229 bgcolor=#E9E9E9
| 563229 ||  || — || December 10, 2002 || Palomar || NEAT ||  || align=right | 1.4 km || 
|-id=230 bgcolor=#E9E9E9
| 563230 ||  || — || December 9, 2010 || Kitt Peak || Spacewatch ||  || align=right | 1.9 km || 
|-id=231 bgcolor=#E9E9E9
| 563231 ||  || — || September 17, 2009 || Catalina || CSS ||  || align=right | 2.5 km || 
|-id=232 bgcolor=#d6d6d6
| 563232 ||  || — || September 21, 2009 || Mount Lemmon || Mount Lemmon Survey ||  || align=right | 1.9 km || 
|-id=233 bgcolor=#E9E9E9
| 563233 ||  || — || March 16, 2012 || Haleakala || Pan-STARRS ||  || align=right | 2.3 km || 
|-id=234 bgcolor=#E9E9E9
| 563234 ||  || — || March 16, 2012 || Mount Lemmon || Mount Lemmon Survey ||  || align=right | 1.3 km || 
|-id=235 bgcolor=#E9E9E9
| 563235 ||  || — || March 27, 2012 || Mount Lemmon || Mount Lemmon Survey ||  || align=right | 1.3 km || 
|-id=236 bgcolor=#d6d6d6
| 563236 ||  || — || November 26, 2014 || Mount Lemmon || Mount Lemmon Survey ||  || align=right | 2.9 km || 
|-id=237 bgcolor=#E9E9E9
| 563237 ||  || — || April 1, 2012 || Mount Lemmon || Mount Lemmon Survey ||  || align=right | 2.1 km || 
|-id=238 bgcolor=#d6d6d6
| 563238 ||  || — || June 18, 2006 || Kitt Peak || Spacewatch ||  || align=right | 3.8 km || 
|-id=239 bgcolor=#d6d6d6
| 563239 ||  || — || October 26, 2009 || Kitt Peak || Spacewatch ||  || align=right | 2.5 km || 
|-id=240 bgcolor=#d6d6d6
| 563240 ||  || — || November 10, 2009 || Kitt Peak || Spacewatch ||  || align=right | 2.4 km || 
|-id=241 bgcolor=#E9E9E9
| 563241 ||  || — || January 13, 2002 || Palomar || NEAT ||  || align=right | 1.7 km || 
|-id=242 bgcolor=#E9E9E9
| 563242 ||  || — || February 8, 2007 || Mount Lemmon || Mount Lemmon Survey ||  || align=right | 3.0 km || 
|-id=243 bgcolor=#E9E9E9
| 563243 ||  || — || August 30, 2005 || Kitt Peak || Spacewatch ||  || align=right | 1.4 km || 
|-id=244 bgcolor=#E9E9E9
| 563244 ||  || — || November 10, 2010 || Mount Lemmon || Mount Lemmon Survey ||  || align=right | 1.1 km || 
|-id=245 bgcolor=#E9E9E9
| 563245 ||  || — || February 10, 2008 || Kitt Peak || Spacewatch ||  || align=right | 1.0 km || 
|-id=246 bgcolor=#E9E9E9
| 563246 ||  || — || October 11, 2002 || Palomar || NEAT ||  || align=right | 1.0 km || 
|-id=247 bgcolor=#d6d6d6
| 563247 ||  || — || October 28, 2014 || Haleakala || Pan-STARRS ||  || align=right | 1.8 km || 
|-id=248 bgcolor=#E9E9E9
| 563248 ||  || — || July 14, 2013 || Haleakala || Pan-STARRS ||  || align=right | 1.3 km || 
|-id=249 bgcolor=#fefefe
| 563249 ||  || — || November 7, 2007 || Mount Lemmon || Mount Lemmon Survey ||  || align=right data-sort-value="0.69" | 690 m || 
|-id=250 bgcolor=#E9E9E9
| 563250 ||  || — || October 1, 2014 || Haleakala || Pan-STARRS ||  || align=right | 1.3 km || 
|-id=251 bgcolor=#E9E9E9
| 563251 ||  || — || October 29, 2014 || Haleakala || Pan-STARRS ||  || align=right | 2.2 km || 
|-id=252 bgcolor=#E9E9E9
| 563252 ||  || — || November 8, 2015 || Mount Lemmon || Mount Lemmon Survey ||  || align=right | 2.4 km || 
|-id=253 bgcolor=#E9E9E9
| 563253 ||  || — || August 20, 2014 || Haleakala || Pan-STARRS ||  || align=right data-sort-value="0.91" | 910 m || 
|-id=254 bgcolor=#E9E9E9
| 563254 ||  || — || August 4, 2005 || Palomar || NEAT ||  || align=right | 1.1 km || 
|-id=255 bgcolor=#E9E9E9
| 563255 ||  || — || November 5, 2010 || Kitt Peak || Spacewatch ||  || align=right | 1.1 km || 
|-id=256 bgcolor=#E9E9E9
| 563256 ||  || — || August 16, 2009 || Kitt Peak || Spacewatch ||  || align=right | 1.3 km || 
|-id=257 bgcolor=#E9E9E9
| 563257 ||  || — || July 17, 2004 || Cerro Tololo || Cerro Tololo Obs. ||  || align=right | 1.9 km || 
|-id=258 bgcolor=#E9E9E9
| 563258 ||  || — || December 10, 2010 || Mount Lemmon || Mount Lemmon Survey ||  || align=right | 1.2 km || 
|-id=259 bgcolor=#E9E9E9
| 563259 ||  || — || May 15, 2013 || Haleakala || Pan-STARRS ||  || align=right data-sort-value="0.92" | 920 m || 
|-id=260 bgcolor=#E9E9E9
| 563260 ||  || — || February 28, 2012 || Haleakala || Pan-STARRS ||  || align=right | 1.3 km || 
|-id=261 bgcolor=#E9E9E9
| 563261 ||  || — || September 30, 2010 || Mount Lemmon || Mount Lemmon Survey ||  || align=right | 1.1 km || 
|-id=262 bgcolor=#E9E9E9
| 563262 ||  || — || September 19, 2014 || Haleakala || Pan-STARRS ||  || align=right | 1.2 km || 
|-id=263 bgcolor=#E9E9E9
| 563263 ||  || — || October 11, 2005 || Kitt Peak || Spacewatch ||  || align=right | 1.7 km || 
|-id=264 bgcolor=#d6d6d6
| 563264 ||  || — || January 29, 2011 || Mount Lemmon || Mount Lemmon Survey ||  || align=right | 1.6 km || 
|-id=265 bgcolor=#E9E9E9
| 563265 ||  || — || September 6, 2013 || Mount Lemmon || Mount Lemmon Survey ||  || align=right | 2.2 km || 
|-id=266 bgcolor=#E9E9E9
| 563266 ||  || — || October 27, 2014 || Haleakala || Pan-STARRS ||  || align=right data-sort-value="0.74" | 740 m || 
|-id=267 bgcolor=#E9E9E9
| 563267 ||  || — || February 28, 2012 || Haleakala || Pan-STARRS ||  || align=right | 1.2 km || 
|-id=268 bgcolor=#d6d6d6
| 563268 ||  || — || November 25, 2005 || Mount Lemmon || Mount Lemmon Survey ||  || align=right | 2.5 km || 
|-id=269 bgcolor=#E9E9E9
| 563269 ||  || — || October 29, 2010 || Kitt Peak || Spacewatch ||  || align=right | 1.7 km || 
|-id=270 bgcolor=#E9E9E9
| 563270 ||  || — || February 28, 2008 || Kitt Peak || Spacewatch ||  || align=right data-sort-value="0.76" | 760 m || 
|-id=271 bgcolor=#E9E9E9
| 563271 ||  || — || October 24, 2009 || Kitt Peak || Spacewatch ||  || align=right | 2.1 km || 
|-id=272 bgcolor=#E9E9E9
| 563272 ||  || — || December 2, 2010 || Mayhill-ISON || L. Elenin ||  || align=right | 1.3 km || 
|-id=273 bgcolor=#E9E9E9
| 563273 ||  || — || September 25, 2014 || Mount Lemmon || Mount Lemmon Survey ||  || align=right data-sort-value="0.88" | 880 m || 
|-id=274 bgcolor=#E9E9E9
| 563274 ||  || — || November 10, 2010 || Mount Lemmon || Mount Lemmon Survey ||  || align=right | 1.3 km || 
|-id=275 bgcolor=#E9E9E9
| 563275 ||  || — || July 15, 2013 || Haleakala || Pan-STARRS ||  || align=right | 2.1 km || 
|-id=276 bgcolor=#E9E9E9
| 563276 ||  || — || November 1, 2005 || Kitt Peak || Spacewatch ||  || align=right | 1.9 km || 
|-id=277 bgcolor=#E9E9E9
| 563277 ||  || — || November 2, 2010 || Mount Lemmon || Mount Lemmon Survey ||  || align=right data-sort-value="0.72" | 720 m || 
|-id=278 bgcolor=#E9E9E9
| 563278 ||  || — || March 16, 2007 || Kitt Peak || Spacewatch ||  || align=right | 1.4 km || 
|-id=279 bgcolor=#E9E9E9
| 563279 ||  || — || July 12, 2013 || Haleakala || Pan-STARRS ||  || align=right | 2.1 km || 
|-id=280 bgcolor=#d6d6d6
| 563280 ||  || — || November 17, 2014 || Mount Lemmon || Mount Lemmon Survey ||  || align=right | 1.9 km || 
|-id=281 bgcolor=#E9E9E9
| 563281 ||  || — || June 20, 2013 || Haleakala || Pan-STARRS ||  || align=right | 1.2 km || 
|-id=282 bgcolor=#E9E9E9
| 563282 ||  || — || August 31, 2005 || Kitt Peak || Spacewatch ||  || align=right | 1.3 km || 
|-id=283 bgcolor=#E9E9E9
| 563283 ||  || — || May 5, 2008 || Mount Lemmon || Mount Lemmon Survey ||  || align=right | 1.4 km || 
|-id=284 bgcolor=#d6d6d6
| 563284 ||  || — || March 19, 2007 || Mount Lemmon || Mount Lemmon Survey ||  || align=right | 2.3 km || 
|-id=285 bgcolor=#E9E9E9
| 563285 ||  || — || March 23, 2007 || Mauna Kea || Mauna Kea Obs. ||  || align=right | 1.5 km || 
|-id=286 bgcolor=#E9E9E9
| 563286 ||  || — || August 27, 2009 || Kitt Peak || CSS ||  || align=right | 1.8 km || 
|-id=287 bgcolor=#E9E9E9
| 563287 ||  || — || March 17, 2012 || Mount Lemmon || Mount Lemmon Survey ||  || align=right | 1.4 km || 
|-id=288 bgcolor=#E9E9E9
| 563288 ||  || — || January 7, 2016 || Haleakala || Pan-STARRS ||  || align=right | 1.3 km || 
|-id=289 bgcolor=#E9E9E9
| 563289 ||  || — || August 27, 2014 || Haleakala || Pan-STARRS || EUN || align=right data-sort-value="0.82" | 820 m || 
|-id=290 bgcolor=#E9E9E9
| 563290 ||  || — || September 25, 2006 || Kitt Peak || Spacewatch ||  || align=right | 1.0 km || 
|-id=291 bgcolor=#fefefe
| 563291 ||  || — || January 20, 2009 || Mount Lemmon || Mount Lemmon Survey ||  || align=right data-sort-value="0.75" | 750 m || 
|-id=292 bgcolor=#E9E9E9
| 563292 ||  || — || February 27, 2012 || Haleakala || Pan-STARRS ||  || align=right | 1.3 km || 
|-id=293 bgcolor=#E9E9E9
| 563293 ||  || — || October 29, 2005 || Mount Lemmon || Mount Lemmon Survey ||  || align=right | 2.2 km || 
|-id=294 bgcolor=#E9E9E9
| 563294 ||  || — || July 8, 2013 || Haleakala || Pan-STARRS ||  || align=right | 1.1 km || 
|-id=295 bgcolor=#E9E9E9
| 563295 ||  || — || September 17, 2014 || Haleakala || Pan-STARRS ||  || align=right | 1.3 km || 
|-id=296 bgcolor=#d6d6d6
| 563296 ||  || — || November 1, 2014 || Kitt Peak || Mount Lemmon Survey ||  || align=right | 2.9 km || 
|-id=297 bgcolor=#d6d6d6
| 563297 ||  || — || October 6, 2008 || Mount Lemmon || Mount Lemmon Survey ||  || align=right | 2.6 km || 
|-id=298 bgcolor=#E9E9E9
| 563298 ||  || — || August 18, 2006 || Palomar || Spacewatch ||  || align=right data-sort-value="0.97" | 970 m || 
|-id=299 bgcolor=#d6d6d6
| 563299 ||  || — || November 17, 2009 || Mount Lemmon || Mount Lemmon Survey ||  || align=right | 2.6 km || 
|-id=300 bgcolor=#d6d6d6
| 563300 ||  || — || September 30, 2009 || Mount Lemmon || Mount Lemmon Survey ||  || align=right | 2.1 km || 
|}

563301–563400 

|-bgcolor=#E9E9E9
| 563301 ||  || — || June 17, 2013 || Haleakala || Pan-STARRS ||  || align=right | 1.2 km || 
|-id=302 bgcolor=#E9E9E9
| 563302 ||  || — || October 27, 2005 || Kitt Peak || Spacewatch ||  || align=right | 2.0 km || 
|-id=303 bgcolor=#E9E9E9
| 563303 ||  || — || April 11, 2012 || Mount Lemmon || Mount Lemmon Survey ||  || align=right | 1.7 km || 
|-id=304 bgcolor=#E9E9E9
| 563304 ||  || — || November 17, 2014 || Haleakala || Pan-STARRS ||  || align=right | 1.3 km || 
|-id=305 bgcolor=#E9E9E9
| 563305 ||  || — || October 24, 1995 || Kitt Peak || Spacewatch ||  || align=right | 1.7 km || 
|-id=306 bgcolor=#E9E9E9
| 563306 ||  || — || December 8, 2010 || Kitt Peak || Spacewatch ||  || align=right | 2.8 km || 
|-id=307 bgcolor=#E9E9E9
| 563307 ||  || — || September 2, 2014 || Haleakala || Pan-STARRS ||  || align=right | 1.3 km || 
|-id=308 bgcolor=#E9E9E9
| 563308 ||  || — || December 13, 2010 || Mount Lemmon || Mount Lemmon Survey ||  || align=right | 1.4 km || 
|-id=309 bgcolor=#E9E9E9
| 563309 ||  || — || February 27, 2012 || Haleakala || Pan-STARRS ||  || align=right | 1.3 km || 
|-id=310 bgcolor=#E9E9E9
| 563310 ||  || — || February 17, 2007 || Mount Lemmon || Mount Lemmon Survey ||  || align=right | 1.7 km || 
|-id=311 bgcolor=#E9E9E9
| 563311 ||  || — || February 21, 2007 || Kitt Peak || Spacewatch ||  || align=right | 1.8 km || 
|-id=312 bgcolor=#E9E9E9
| 563312 ||  || — || March 27, 2012 || Mount Lemmon || Mount Lemmon Survey || EUN || align=right data-sort-value="0.93" | 930 m || 
|-id=313 bgcolor=#E9E9E9
| 563313 ||  || — || March 23, 2003 || Apache Point || SDSS Collaboration ||  || align=right | 1.2 km || 
|-id=314 bgcolor=#E9E9E9
| 563314 ||  || — || August 25, 2014 || Haleakala || Pan-STARRS ||  || align=right data-sort-value="0.74" | 740 m || 
|-id=315 bgcolor=#d6d6d6
| 563315 ||  || — || September 10, 2013 || Haleakala || Pan-STARRS ||  || align=right | 3.8 km || 
|-id=316 bgcolor=#E9E9E9
| 563316 ||  || — || February 9, 2011 || Mount Lemmon || Mount Lemmon Survey ||  || align=right | 2.0 km || 
|-id=317 bgcolor=#d6d6d6
| 563317 ||  || — || January 16, 2005 || Kitt Peak || Spacewatch ||  || align=right | 3.1 km || 
|-id=318 bgcolor=#E9E9E9
| 563318 ten Kate ||  ||  || October 27, 2014 || Piszkesteto || M. Langbroek, K. Sárneczky ||  || align=right | 1.9 km || 
|-id=319 bgcolor=#E9E9E9
| 563319 ||  || — || May 28, 2012 || Kitt Peak || Spacewatch ||  || align=right | 1.8 km || 
|-id=320 bgcolor=#E9E9E9
| 563320 ||  || — || November 16, 2014 || Haleakala || Pan-STARRS ||  || align=right | 1.3 km || 
|-id=321 bgcolor=#E9E9E9
| 563321 ||  || — || January 19, 2012 || Haleakala || Pan-STARRS ||  || align=right data-sort-value="0.77" | 770 m || 
|-id=322 bgcolor=#E9E9E9
| 563322 ||  || — || March 16, 2012 || Haleakala || Pan-STARRS ||  || align=right | 2.3 km || 
|-id=323 bgcolor=#E9E9E9
| 563323 ||  || — || May 26, 2003 || Kitt Peak || Spacewatch ||  || align=right | 1.6 km || 
|-id=324 bgcolor=#E9E9E9
| 563324 ||  || — || November 20, 2001 || Socorro || LINEAR ||  || align=right | 1.7 km || 
|-id=325 bgcolor=#E9E9E9
| 563325 ||  || — || March 28, 2012 || Mount Lemmon || Mount Lemmon Survey ||  || align=right | 1.7 km || 
|-id=326 bgcolor=#d6d6d6
| 563326 ||  || — || January 23, 2006 || Kitt Peak || Spacewatch ||  || align=right | 2.5 km || 
|-id=327 bgcolor=#E9E9E9
| 563327 ||  || — || October 11, 2005 || Kitt Peak || Spacewatch ||  || align=right | 1.5 km || 
|-id=328 bgcolor=#E9E9E9
| 563328 ||  || — || December 24, 2006 || Kitt Peak || Spacewatch ||  || align=right | 1.2 km || 
|-id=329 bgcolor=#E9E9E9
| 563329 ||  || — || January 4, 2016 || Haleakala || Pan-STARRS ||  || align=right | 1.2 km || 
|-id=330 bgcolor=#E9E9E9
| 563330 ||  || — || November 30, 2005 || Mount Lemmon || Mount Lemmon Survey ||  || align=right | 1.8 km || 
|-id=331 bgcolor=#E9E9E9
| 563331 ||  || — || February 21, 2007 || Kitt Peak || Spacewatch ||  || align=right | 1.9 km || 
|-id=332 bgcolor=#E9E9E9
| 563332 ||  || — || December 2, 2005 || Kitt Peak || Spacewatch ||  || align=right | 2.0 km || 
|-id=333 bgcolor=#E9E9E9
| 563333 ||  || — || February 23, 2007 || Kitt Peak || Spacewatch ||  || align=right | 1.9 km || 
|-id=334 bgcolor=#E9E9E9
| 563334 ||  || — || November 5, 2010 || Mount Lemmon || Mount Lemmon Survey ||  || align=right | 1.3 km || 
|-id=335 bgcolor=#E9E9E9
| 563335 ||  || — || September 24, 2009 || Mount Lemmon || Mount Lemmon Survey ||  || align=right | 1.7 km || 
|-id=336 bgcolor=#E9E9E9
| 563336 ||  || — || October 25, 2014 || Mount Lemmon || Mount Lemmon Survey ||  || align=right | 1.1 km || 
|-id=337 bgcolor=#fefefe
| 563337 ||  || — || October 24, 2003 || Anderson Mesa || LONEOS ||  || align=right data-sort-value="0.87" | 870 m || 
|-id=338 bgcolor=#E9E9E9
| 563338 ||  || — || October 1, 2014 || Haleakala || Pan-STARRS ||  || align=right | 1.6 km || 
|-id=339 bgcolor=#E9E9E9
| 563339 ||  || — || August 28, 2009 || Kitt Peak || Spacewatch ||  || align=right | 1.6 km || 
|-id=340 bgcolor=#E9E9E9
| 563340 ||  || — || January 30, 2016 || Mount Lemmon || Mount Lemmon Survey ||  || align=right | 1.9 km || 
|-id=341 bgcolor=#d6d6d6
| 563341 ||  || — || December 5, 2005 || Kitt Peak || Spacewatch ||  || align=right | 2.3 km || 
|-id=342 bgcolor=#E9E9E9
| 563342 ||  || — || July 7, 2014 || Haleakala || Pan-STARRS ||  || align=right | 1.1 km || 
|-id=343 bgcolor=#E9E9E9
| 563343 ||  || — || February 8, 2002 || Kitt Peak || Spacewatch ||  || align=right | 1.6 km || 
|-id=344 bgcolor=#E9E9E9
| 563344 ||  || — || January 4, 2016 || Haleakala || Pan-STARRS ||  || align=right | 1.6 km || 
|-id=345 bgcolor=#E9E9E9
| 563345 ||  || — || September 29, 2005 || Kitt Peak || Spacewatch ||  || align=right | 1.6 km || 
|-id=346 bgcolor=#fefefe
| 563346 ||  || — || May 31, 2009 || Kitt Peak || Spacewatch ||  || align=right data-sort-value="0.98" | 980 m || 
|-id=347 bgcolor=#fefefe
| 563347 ||  || — || March 2, 2009 || Kitt Peak || Spacewatch ||  || align=right data-sort-value="0.64" | 640 m || 
|-id=348 bgcolor=#C2FFFF
| 563348 ||  || — || October 17, 2012 || Haleakala || Pan-STARRS || L5 || align=right | 7.0 km || 
|-id=349 bgcolor=#E9E9E9
| 563349 ||  || — || August 18, 2014 || Haleakala || Pan-STARRS || (5) || align=right data-sort-value="0.69" | 690 m || 
|-id=350 bgcolor=#E9E9E9
| 563350 ||  || — || August 21, 2006 || Kitt Peak || Spacewatch ||  || align=right data-sort-value="0.77" | 770 m || 
|-id=351 bgcolor=#d6d6d6
| 563351 ||  || — || January 2, 2011 || Mount Lemmon || Mount Lemmon Survey ||  || align=right | 2.1 km || 
|-id=352 bgcolor=#E9E9E9
| 563352 ||  || — || March 6, 1999 || Kitt Peak || Spacewatch || MIS || align=right | 2.0 km || 
|-id=353 bgcolor=#E9E9E9
| 563353 ||  || — || December 2, 2010 || Mount Lemmon || Mount Lemmon Survey ||  || align=right | 1.8 km || 
|-id=354 bgcolor=#E9E9E9
| 563354 ||  || — || January 28, 2007 || Mount Lemmon || Mount Lemmon Survey ||  || align=right | 1.8 km || 
|-id=355 bgcolor=#E9E9E9
| 563355 ||  || — || April 21, 2013 || Haleakala || Pan-STARRS ||  || align=right | 1.0 km || 
|-id=356 bgcolor=#E9E9E9
| 563356 ||  || — || August 28, 2014 || Haleakala || Pan-STARRS ||  || align=right data-sort-value="0.67" | 670 m || 
|-id=357 bgcolor=#E9E9E9
| 563357 ||  || — || August 18, 2009 || Kitt Peak || Spacewatch ||  || align=right | 2.6 km || 
|-id=358 bgcolor=#E9E9E9
| 563358 ||  || — || September 16, 2010 || Mount Lemmon || Mount Lemmon Survey ||  || align=right | 1.5 km || 
|-id=359 bgcolor=#E9E9E9
| 563359 ||  || — || January 7, 2016 || Haleakala || Pan-STARRS ||  || align=right | 2.2 km || 
|-id=360 bgcolor=#E9E9E9
| 563360 ||  || — || August 29, 2005 || Kitt Peak || Spacewatch ||  || align=right | 1.4 km || 
|-id=361 bgcolor=#E9E9E9
| 563361 ||  || — || January 19, 2012 || Haleakala || Pan-STARRS ||  || align=right | 1.2 km || 
|-id=362 bgcolor=#E9E9E9
| 563362 ||  || — || October 28, 2014 || Haleakala || Pan-STARRS ||  || align=right | 1.8 km || 
|-id=363 bgcolor=#E9E9E9
| 563363 ||  || — || January 28, 2007 || Mount Lemmon || Mount Lemmon Survey ||  || align=right | 2.2 km || 
|-id=364 bgcolor=#E9E9E9
| 563364 ||  || — || February 27, 2012 || Kitt Peak || Spacewatch ||  || align=right | 1.3 km || 
|-id=365 bgcolor=#E9E9E9
| 563365 ||  || — || April 6, 2008 || Kitt Peak || Spacewatch ||  || align=right | 2.3 km || 
|-id=366 bgcolor=#E9E9E9
| 563366 ||  || — || July 27, 2009 || Kitt Peak || Spacewatch ||  || align=right | 2.0 km || 
|-id=367 bgcolor=#E9E9E9
| 563367 ||  || — || August 30, 2014 || Mount Lemmon || Mount Lemmon Survey ||  || align=right | 2.0 km || 
|-id=368 bgcolor=#E9E9E9
| 563368 ||  || — || January 18, 2008 || Mount Lemmon || Mount Lemmon Survey ||  || align=right data-sort-value="0.83" | 830 m || 
|-id=369 bgcolor=#E9E9E9
| 563369 ||  || — || January 25, 2003 || Palomar || NEAT ||  || align=right | 1.8 km || 
|-id=370 bgcolor=#E9E9E9
| 563370 ||  || — || April 6, 2008 || Kitt Peak || Spacewatch ||  || align=right | 2.1 km || 
|-id=371 bgcolor=#E9E9E9
| 563371 ||  || — || February 23, 2012 || Catalina || CSS ||  || align=right | 1.5 km || 
|-id=372 bgcolor=#E9E9E9
| 563372 ||  || — || October 2, 2014 || Catalina || CSS ||  || align=right | 1.6 km || 
|-id=373 bgcolor=#E9E9E9
| 563373 ||  || — || July 1, 2005 || Palomar || NEAT || EUN || align=right | 1.4 km || 
|-id=374 bgcolor=#E9E9E9
| 563374 ||  || — || November 25, 2010 || Mount Lemmon || Mount Lemmon Survey ||  || align=right | 1.5 km || 
|-id=375 bgcolor=#E9E9E9
| 563375 ||  || — || June 30, 2014 || Haleakala || Pan-STARRS ||  || align=right | 1.0 km || 
|-id=376 bgcolor=#E9E9E9
| 563376 ||  || — || November 20, 2014 || Haleakala || Pan-STARRS ||  || align=right | 1.3 km || 
|-id=377 bgcolor=#E9E9E9
| 563377 ||  || — || October 24, 2009 || Kitt Peak || Spacewatch ||  || align=right | 1.8 km || 
|-id=378 bgcolor=#E9E9E9
| 563378 ||  || — || March 28, 2012 || Mount Lemmon || Mount Lemmon Survey ||  || align=right | 1.5 km || 
|-id=379 bgcolor=#d6d6d6
| 563379 ||  || — || November 30, 2005 || Kitt Peak || Spacewatch ||  || align=right | 2.3 km || 
|-id=380 bgcolor=#E9E9E9
| 563380 ||  || — || November 30, 2010 || Mount Lemmon || Mount Lemmon Survey ||  || align=right | 1.4 km || 
|-id=381 bgcolor=#E9E9E9
| 563381 ||  || — || January 4, 2016 || Kitt Peak || Pan-STARRS ||  || align=right | 1.8 km || 
|-id=382 bgcolor=#E9E9E9
| 563382 ||  || — || February 23, 2012 || Mount Lemmon || Mount Lemmon Survey ||  || align=right | 1.2 km || 
|-id=383 bgcolor=#FA8072
| 563383 ||  || — || January 25, 2003 || Palomar || NEAT || H || align=right data-sort-value="0.72" | 720 m || 
|-id=384 bgcolor=#fefefe
| 563384 ||  || — || May 9, 2006 || Mount Lemmon || Mount Lemmon Survey || H || align=right data-sort-value="0.61" | 610 m || 
|-id=385 bgcolor=#d6d6d6
| 563385 ||  || — || December 2, 2005 || Kitt Peak || Spacewatch ||  || align=right | 2.2 km || 
|-id=386 bgcolor=#E9E9E9
| 563386 ||  || — || July 14, 2013 || Haleakala || Pan-STARRS ||  || align=right | 1.3 km || 
|-id=387 bgcolor=#E9E9E9
| 563387 ||  || — || December 6, 2010 || Mount Lemmon || Mount Lemmon Survey ||  || align=right | 1.5 km || 
|-id=388 bgcolor=#E9E9E9
| 563388 ||  || — || October 27, 2005 || Mount Lemmon || Mount Lemmon Survey ||  || align=right | 1.1 km || 
|-id=389 bgcolor=#E9E9E9
| 563389 ||  || — || February 27, 2012 || Haleakala || Pan-STARRS ||  || align=right | 1.2 km || 
|-id=390 bgcolor=#E9E9E9
| 563390 ||  || — || September 22, 2009 || Kitt Peak || Spacewatch ||  || align=right | 1.9 km || 
|-id=391 bgcolor=#d6d6d6
| 563391 ||  || — || January 20, 2006 || Kitt Peak || Spacewatch ||  || align=right | 2.0 km || 
|-id=392 bgcolor=#E9E9E9
| 563392 ||  || — || January 4, 2011 || Mount Lemmon || Mount Lemmon Survey ||  || align=right | 1.8 km || 
|-id=393 bgcolor=#E9E9E9
| 563393 ||  || — || December 10, 2010 || Mount Lemmon || Mount Lemmon Survey ||  || align=right | 1.8 km || 
|-id=394 bgcolor=#E9E9E9
| 563394 ||  || — || February 27, 2012 || Haleakala || Pan-STARRS ||  || align=right | 1.8 km || 
|-id=395 bgcolor=#E9E9E9
| 563395 ||  || — || March 15, 2007 || Kitt Peak || Spacewatch ||  || align=right | 1.8 km || 
|-id=396 bgcolor=#E9E9E9
| 563396 ||  || — || January 25, 2007 || Kitt Peak || Spacewatch ||  || align=right | 1.5 km || 
|-id=397 bgcolor=#E9E9E9
| 563397 ||  || — || November 29, 2005 || Mount Lemmon || Mount Lemmon Survey ||  || align=right | 1.7 km || 
|-id=398 bgcolor=#E9E9E9
| 563398 ||  || — || April 27, 2012 || Haleakala || Pan-STARRS ||  || align=right | 1.8 km || 
|-id=399 bgcolor=#E9E9E9
| 563399 ||  || — || January 9, 2002 || Apache Point || SDSS Collaboration ||  || align=right | 1.5 km || 
|-id=400 bgcolor=#E9E9E9
| 563400 ||  || — || January 29, 2007 || Kitt Peak || Spacewatch ||  || align=right | 1.9 km || 
|}

563401–563500 

|-bgcolor=#E9E9E9
| 563401 ||  || — || March 10, 2007 || Mount Lemmon || Mount Lemmon Survey ||  || align=right | 1.7 km || 
|-id=402 bgcolor=#E9E9E9
| 563402 ||  || — || October 21, 2014 || Mount Lemmon || Mount Lemmon Survey ||  || align=right | 1.8 km || 
|-id=403 bgcolor=#E9E9E9
| 563403 ||  || — || September 29, 2005 || Kitt Peak || Spacewatch ||  || align=right | 1.9 km || 
|-id=404 bgcolor=#E9E9E9
| 563404 ||  || — || December 26, 2006 || Kitt Peak || Spacewatch ||  || align=right | 1.2 km || 
|-id=405 bgcolor=#E9E9E9
| 563405 ||  || — || November 22, 2006 || Kitt Peak || Spacewatch ||  || align=right data-sort-value="0.85" | 850 m || 
|-id=406 bgcolor=#E9E9E9
| 563406 ||  || — || September 16, 2009 || Kitt Peak || Spacewatch ||  || align=right | 1.8 km || 
|-id=407 bgcolor=#E9E9E9
| 563407 ||  || — || January 28, 2007 || Kitt Peak || Spacewatch ||  || align=right | 1.3 km || 
|-id=408 bgcolor=#E9E9E9
| 563408 ||  || — || April 9, 2008 || Kitt Peak || Spacewatch ||  || align=right | 1.1 km || 
|-id=409 bgcolor=#E9E9E9
| 563409 ||  || — || March 12, 2008 || Mount Lemmon || Mount Lemmon Survey ||  || align=right data-sort-value="0.71" | 710 m || 
|-id=410 bgcolor=#E9E9E9
| 563410 ||  || — || January 14, 2011 || Kitt Peak || Spacewatch ||  || align=right | 1.9 km || 
|-id=411 bgcolor=#E9E9E9
| 563411 ||  || — || February 8, 2007 || Kitt Peak || Spacewatch ||  || align=right | 1.9 km || 
|-id=412 bgcolor=#E9E9E9
| 563412 ||  || — || March 24, 2012 || Mount Lemmon || Mount Lemmon Survey ||  || align=right | 1.2 km || 
|-id=413 bgcolor=#d6d6d6
| 563413 ||  || — || January 31, 2006 || Kitt Peak || Spacewatch ||  || align=right | 2.2 km || 
|-id=414 bgcolor=#fefefe
| 563414 ||  || — || January 26, 2012 || Haleakala || Pan-STARRS ||  || align=right data-sort-value="0.64" | 640 m || 
|-id=415 bgcolor=#E9E9E9
| 563415 ||  || — || August 8, 2013 || La Sagra || OAM Obs. ||  || align=right | 1.9 km || 
|-id=416 bgcolor=#E9E9E9
| 563416 ||  || — || September 21, 2009 || Mount Lemmon || Mount Lemmon Survey ||  || align=right | 1.8 km || 
|-id=417 bgcolor=#d6d6d6
| 563417 ||  || — || January 30, 2011 || Kitt Peak || Spacewatch ||  || align=right | 3.3 km || 
|-id=418 bgcolor=#E9E9E9
| 563418 ||  || — || December 27, 2011 || Mount Lemmon || Mount Lemmon Survey ||  || align=right data-sort-value="0.77" | 770 m || 
|-id=419 bgcolor=#E9E9E9
| 563419 ||  || — || July 14, 2013 || Haleakala || Pan-STARRS ||  || align=right | 1.6 km || 
|-id=420 bgcolor=#d6d6d6
| 563420 ||  || — || February 7, 2011 || Mount Lemmon || Mount Lemmon Survey ||  || align=right | 1.8 km || 
|-id=421 bgcolor=#E9E9E9
| 563421 ||  || — || September 1, 2014 || Kitt Peak || Spacewatch ||  || align=right | 1.6 km || 
|-id=422 bgcolor=#E9E9E9
| 563422 ||  || — || February 25, 2007 || Kitt Peak || Mount Lemmon Survey ||  || align=right | 1.8 km || 
|-id=423 bgcolor=#E9E9E9
| 563423 ||  || — || January 9, 2011 || Mount Lemmon || Mount Lemmon Survey ||  || align=right | 1.8 km || 
|-id=424 bgcolor=#d6d6d6
| 563424 ||  || — || February 10, 2011 || Mount Lemmon || Mount Lemmon Survey ||  || align=right | 2.0 km || 
|-id=425 bgcolor=#E9E9E9
| 563425 ||  || — || October 2, 2014 || Haleakala || Pan-STARRS ||  || align=right | 1.4 km || 
|-id=426 bgcolor=#E9E9E9
| 563426 ||  || — || March 14, 2012 || Mount Lemmon || Mount Lemmon Survey ||  || align=right | 1.4 km || 
|-id=427 bgcolor=#E9E9E9
| 563427 ||  || — || December 10, 2002 || Palomar || NEAT ||  || align=right | 1.1 km || 
|-id=428 bgcolor=#E9E9E9
| 563428 ||  || — || January 31, 2008 || Mount Lemmon || Mount Lemmon Survey ||  || align=right data-sort-value="0.60" | 600 m || 
|-id=429 bgcolor=#d6d6d6
| 563429 ||  || — || October 7, 2004 || Kitt Peak || Spacewatch ||  || align=right | 2.2 km || 
|-id=430 bgcolor=#E9E9E9
| 563430 ||  || — || August 19, 2014 || Haleakala || Pan-STARRS ||  || align=right | 1.3 km || 
|-id=431 bgcolor=#E9E9E9
| 563431 ||  || — || April 20, 2012 || Mount Lemmon || Mount Lemmon Survey ||  || align=right | 2.1 km || 
|-id=432 bgcolor=#E9E9E9
| 563432 ||  || — || April 6, 2008 || Kitt Peak || Spacewatch ||  || align=right | 1.4 km || 
|-id=433 bgcolor=#E9E9E9
| 563433 ||  || — || August 23, 2014 || Haleakala || Pan-STARRS ||  || align=right | 1.6 km || 
|-id=434 bgcolor=#E9E9E9
| 563434 ||  || — || March 15, 2007 || Catalina || CSS ||  || align=right | 2.0 km || 
|-id=435 bgcolor=#E9E9E9
| 563435 ||  || — || October 25, 2001 || Apache Point || SDSS Collaboration || ADE || align=right | 1.7 km || 
|-id=436 bgcolor=#d6d6d6
| 563436 ||  || — || August 22, 2014 || Haleakala || Pan-STARRS ||  || align=right | 2.4 km || 
|-id=437 bgcolor=#d6d6d6
| 563437 ||  || — || October 2, 2014 || Haleakala || Pan-STARRS ||  || align=right | 2.1 km || 
|-id=438 bgcolor=#E9E9E9
| 563438 ||  || — || January 3, 2016 || Haleakala || Pan-STARRS ||  || align=right | 1.7 km || 
|-id=439 bgcolor=#E9E9E9
| 563439 ||  || — || October 26, 2014 || Mount Lemmon || Mount Lemmon Survey ||  || align=right | 1.3 km || 
|-id=440 bgcolor=#d6d6d6
| 563440 ||  || — || January 28, 2011 || Catalina || CSS ||  || align=right | 2.9 km || 
|-id=441 bgcolor=#d6d6d6
| 563441 ||  || — || November 8, 2009 || Mount Lemmon || Mount Lemmon Survey ||  || align=right | 2.2 km || 
|-id=442 bgcolor=#E9E9E9
| 563442 ||  || — || December 13, 2006 || Kitt Peak || Spacewatch ||  || align=right | 1.7 km || 
|-id=443 bgcolor=#E9E9E9
| 563443 ||  || — || August 26, 2014 || Haleakala || Pan-STARRS ||  || align=right data-sort-value="0.87" | 870 m || 
|-id=444 bgcolor=#E9E9E9
| 563444 ||  || — || November 7, 2010 || Mount Lemmon || Mount Lemmon Survey ||  || align=right | 2.0 km || 
|-id=445 bgcolor=#E9E9E9
| 563445 ||  || — || March 15, 2012 || Mount Lemmon || Mount Lemmon Survey ||  || align=right | 2.4 km || 
|-id=446 bgcolor=#E9E9E9
| 563446 ||  || — || April 14, 2008 || Mount Lemmon || Mount Lemmon Survey ||  || align=right | 1.6 km || 
|-id=447 bgcolor=#E9E9E9
| 563447 ||  || — || October 14, 2014 || Catalina || CSS || MAR || align=right data-sort-value="0.98" | 980 m || 
|-id=448 bgcolor=#E9E9E9
| 563448 ||  || — || September 28, 2014 || Haleakala || Pan-STARRS ||  || align=right | 1.5 km || 
|-id=449 bgcolor=#E9E9E9
| 563449 ||  || — || January 5, 2011 || Catalina || CSS ||  || align=right | 2.1 km || 
|-id=450 bgcolor=#E9E9E9
| 563450 ||  || — || January 5, 2011 || Mount Lemmon || Mount Lemmon Survey ||  || align=right | 1.7 km || 
|-id=451 bgcolor=#E9E9E9
| 563451 ||  || — || December 30, 2005 || Kitt Peak || Spacewatch ||  || align=right | 2.2 km || 
|-id=452 bgcolor=#E9E9E9
| 563452 ||  || — || September 25, 2006 || Kitt Peak || Spacewatch ||  || align=right data-sort-value="0.67" | 670 m || 
|-id=453 bgcolor=#E9E9E9
| 563453 ||  || — || December 21, 2006 || Mount Lemmon || Mount Lemmon Survey ||  || align=right | 2.1 km || 
|-id=454 bgcolor=#E9E9E9
| 563454 ||  || — || February 16, 2012 || Haleakala || Pan-STARRS ||  || align=right | 1.00 km || 
|-id=455 bgcolor=#E9E9E9
| 563455 ||  || — || August 31, 2005 || Palomar || NEAT ||  || align=right | 2.3 km || 
|-id=456 bgcolor=#E9E9E9
| 563456 ||  || — || April 9, 2008 || Mount Lemmon || Mount Lemmon Survey ||  || align=right | 1.2 km || 
|-id=457 bgcolor=#E9E9E9
| 563457 ||  || — || November 5, 2010 || Kitt Peak || Spacewatch ||  || align=right | 2.4 km || 
|-id=458 bgcolor=#E9E9E9
| 563458 ||  || — || July 20, 2001 || Anderson Mesa || LONEOS ||  || align=right | 1.1 km || 
|-id=459 bgcolor=#E9E9E9
| 563459 ||  || — || June 8, 2013 || Siding Spring || SSS ||  || align=right | 3.1 km || 
|-id=460 bgcolor=#E9E9E9
| 563460 ||  || — || August 17, 2009 || Kitt Peak || Spacewatch ||  || align=right | 2.3 km || 
|-id=461 bgcolor=#E9E9E9
| 563461 ||  || — || October 25, 2001 || Apache Point || SDSS Collaboration ||  || align=right | 1.1 km || 
|-id=462 bgcolor=#E9E9E9
| 563462 ||  || — || November 2, 2010 || Kitt Peak || Spacewatch ||  || align=right | 1.3 km || 
|-id=463 bgcolor=#E9E9E9
| 563463 ||  || — || March 16, 2012 || Haleakala || Pan-STARRS ||  || align=right | 1.0 km || 
|-id=464 bgcolor=#E9E9E9
| 563464 ||  || — || November 20, 2006 || Kitt Peak || Spacewatch ||  || align=right | 1.5 km || 
|-id=465 bgcolor=#E9E9E9
| 563465 ||  || — || October 27, 2005 || Mount Lemmon || Mount Lemmon Survey || AGN || align=right data-sort-value="0.97" | 970 m || 
|-id=466 bgcolor=#d6d6d6
| 563466 ||  || — || March 21, 2001 || Kitt Peak || Spacewatch ||  || align=right | 2.4 km || 
|-id=467 bgcolor=#E9E9E9
| 563467 ||  || — || August 5, 2014 || Haleakala || Pan-STARRS ||  || align=right data-sort-value="0.98" | 980 m || 
|-id=468 bgcolor=#d6d6d6
| 563468 ||  || — || April 5, 2010 || Bergisch Gladbach || W. Bickel ||  || align=right | 3.8 km || 
|-id=469 bgcolor=#E9E9E9
| 563469 ||  || — || October 8, 2004 || Kitt Peak || Spacewatch ||  || align=right | 2.3 km || 
|-id=470 bgcolor=#d6d6d6
| 563470 ||  || — || March 17, 2005 || Mount Lemmon || Mount Lemmon Survey ||  || align=right | 2.8 km || 
|-id=471 bgcolor=#d6d6d6
| 563471 ||  || — || January 15, 2015 || Mount Lemmon || Mount Lemmon Survey ||  || align=right | 2.5 km || 
|-id=472 bgcolor=#E9E9E9
| 563472 ||  || — || August 25, 2004 || Kitt Peak || Spacewatch ||  || align=right | 2.0 km || 
|-id=473 bgcolor=#E9E9E9
| 563473 ||  || — || December 27, 2011 || Mount Lemmon || Mount Lemmon Survey ||  || align=right | 1.6 km || 
|-id=474 bgcolor=#fefefe
| 563474 ||  || — || September 21, 1996 || Kitt Peak || Spacewatch || H || align=right data-sort-value="0.57" | 570 m || 
|-id=475 bgcolor=#FA8072
| 563475 ||  || — || March 6, 2011 || Bergisch Gladbach || W. Bickel || H || align=right data-sort-value="0.38" | 380 m || 
|-id=476 bgcolor=#fefefe
| 563476 ||  || — || February 14, 2016 || Haleakala || Pan-STARRS || H || align=right data-sort-value="0.53" | 530 m || 
|-id=477 bgcolor=#fefefe
| 563477 ||  || — || September 17, 2014 || Haleakala || Pan-STARRS || H || align=right data-sort-value="0.75" | 750 m || 
|-id=478 bgcolor=#E9E9E9
| 563478 ||  || — || February 5, 2016 || Haleakala || Pan-STARRS ||  || align=right data-sort-value="0.79" | 790 m || 
|-id=479 bgcolor=#E9E9E9
| 563479 ||  || — || January 20, 2002 || Kitt Peak || Spacewatch ||  || align=right | 1.7 km || 
|-id=480 bgcolor=#E9E9E9
| 563480 ||  || — || June 2, 2008 || Mount Lemmon || Mount Lemmon Survey ||  || align=right | 1.3 km || 
|-id=481 bgcolor=#E9E9E9
| 563481 ||  || — || March 13, 2007 || Mount Lemmon || Mount Lemmon Survey ||  || align=right | 1.7 km || 
|-id=482 bgcolor=#d6d6d6
| 563482 ||  || — || February 9, 2016 || Haleakala || Pan-STARRS ||  || align=right | 3.1 km || 
|-id=483 bgcolor=#E9E9E9
| 563483 ||  || — || February 10, 2007 || Mount Lemmon || Mount Lemmon Survey ||  || align=right | 1.3 km || 
|-id=484 bgcolor=#E9E9E9
| 563484 ||  || — || February 9, 2016 || Kitt Peak || Pan-STARRS ||  || align=right | 1.7 km || 
|-id=485 bgcolor=#E9E9E9
| 563485 ||  || — || July 25, 2003 || Palomar || NEAT ||  || align=right | 2.6 km || 
|-id=486 bgcolor=#d6d6d6
| 563486 ||  || — || November 18, 2009 || Mount Lemmon || Mount Lemmon Survey ||  || align=right | 2.3 km || 
|-id=487 bgcolor=#d6d6d6
| 563487 ||  || — || May 24, 2006 || Kitt Peak || Spacewatch ||  || align=right | 2.9 km || 
|-id=488 bgcolor=#E9E9E9
| 563488 ||  || — || November 1, 2005 || Mount Lemmon || Mount Lemmon Survey ||  || align=right | 1.7 km || 
|-id=489 bgcolor=#E9E9E9
| 563489 ||  || — || January 12, 2011 || Mount Lemmon || Mount Lemmon Survey ||  || align=right | 1.7 km || 
|-id=490 bgcolor=#E9E9E9
| 563490 ||  || — || November 21, 2014 || Haleakala || Pan-STARRS ||  || align=right data-sort-value="0.96" | 960 m || 
|-id=491 bgcolor=#d6d6d6
| 563491 ||  || — || May 23, 2006 || Mount Lemmon || Mount Lemmon Survey ||  || align=right | 2.9 km || 
|-id=492 bgcolor=#d6d6d6
| 563492 ||  || — || May 1, 2011 || Haleakala || Pan-STARRS ||  || align=right | 2.2 km || 
|-id=493 bgcolor=#E9E9E9
| 563493 ||  || — || September 15, 2009 || Kitt Peak || Spacewatch ||  || align=right | 2.3 km || 
|-id=494 bgcolor=#E9E9E9
| 563494 ||  || — || December 27, 2006 || Mount Lemmon || Mount Lemmon Survey ||  || align=right | 1.1 km || 
|-id=495 bgcolor=#E9E9E9
| 563495 ||  || — || July 12, 2013 || Haleakala || Pan-STARRS ||  || align=right | 2.3 km || 
|-id=496 bgcolor=#d6d6d6
| 563496 ||  || — || September 28, 1997 || Kitt Peak || Spacewatch ||  || align=right | 3.1 km || 
|-id=497 bgcolor=#E9E9E9
| 563497 ||  || — || October 1, 2014 || Haleakala || Pan-STARRS ||  || align=right | 1.3 km || 
|-id=498 bgcolor=#E9E9E9
| 563498 ||  || — || September 27, 2009 || Kitt Peak || Spacewatch ||  || align=right | 1.7 km || 
|-id=499 bgcolor=#E9E9E9
| 563499 ||  || — || March 14, 2007 || Mount Lemmon || Mount Lemmon Survey ||  || align=right | 1.5 km || 
|-id=500 bgcolor=#E9E9E9
| 563500 ||  || — || February 13, 2007 || Mount Lemmon || Mount Lemmon Survey ||  || align=right | 1.3 km || 
|}

563501–563600 

|-bgcolor=#E9E9E9
| 563501 ||  || — || August 27, 2009 || Kitt Peak || Spacewatch ||  || align=right | 1.8 km || 
|-id=502 bgcolor=#E9E9E9
| 563502 ||  || — || November 18, 2006 || Mount Lemmon || Mount Lemmon Survey ||  || align=right | 1.3 km || 
|-id=503 bgcolor=#E9E9E9
| 563503 ||  || — || September 21, 2009 || Mount Lemmon || Mount Lemmon Survey ||  || align=right | 1.9 km || 
|-id=504 bgcolor=#E9E9E9
| 563504 ||  || — || December 30, 2005 || 7300 || W. K. Y. Yeung ||  || align=right | 2.6 km || 
|-id=505 bgcolor=#E9E9E9
| 563505 ||  || — || March 25, 2007 || Mount Lemmon || Mount Lemmon Survey ||  || align=right | 2.4 km || 
|-id=506 bgcolor=#d6d6d6
| 563506 ||  || — || November 2, 2007 || Mount Lemmon || Mount Lemmon Survey ||  || align=right | 3.2 km || 
|-id=507 bgcolor=#E9E9E9
| 563507 ||  || — || October 29, 2010 || Mount Lemmon || Mount Lemmon Survey ||  || align=right data-sort-value="0.73" | 730 m || 
|-id=508 bgcolor=#E9E9E9
| 563508 ||  || — || November 23, 2014 || Haleakala || Pan-STARRS ||  || align=right | 1.1 km || 
|-id=509 bgcolor=#E9E9E9
| 563509 ||  || — || October 28, 2014 || Haleakala || Pan-STARRS ||  || align=right | 1.1 km || 
|-id=510 bgcolor=#E9E9E9
| 563510 ||  || — || September 19, 2014 || Haleakala || Pan-STARRS ||  || align=right data-sort-value="0.65" | 650 m || 
|-id=511 bgcolor=#E9E9E9
| 563511 ||  || — || July 28, 2005 || Palomar || NEAT ||  || align=right data-sort-value="0.83" | 830 m || 
|-id=512 bgcolor=#d6d6d6
| 563512 ||  || — || February 11, 2016 || Haleakala || Pan-STARRS ||  || align=right | 2.8 km || 
|-id=513 bgcolor=#d6d6d6
| 563513 ||  || — || November 22, 2009 || Kitt Peak || Spacewatch ||  || align=right | 3.2 km || 
|-id=514 bgcolor=#d6d6d6
| 563514 ||  || — || September 21, 2008 || Kitt Peak || Spacewatch ||  || align=right | 2.4 km || 
|-id=515 bgcolor=#d6d6d6
| 563515 ||  || — || August 14, 2013 || Haleakala || Pan-STARRS ||  || align=right | 2.1 km || 
|-id=516 bgcolor=#d6d6d6
| 563516 ||  || — || September 14, 2013 || Haleakala || Pan-STARRS ||  || align=right | 2.6 km || 
|-id=517 bgcolor=#d6d6d6
| 563517 ||  || — || December 21, 2014 || Haleakala || Pan-STARRS ||  || align=right | 2.3 km || 
|-id=518 bgcolor=#d6d6d6
| 563518 ||  || — || December 26, 2014 || Haleakala || Pan-STARRS ||  || align=right | 2.4 km || 
|-id=519 bgcolor=#E9E9E9
| 563519 ||  || — || December 10, 2014 || Mount Lemmon || Mount Lemmon Survey ||  || align=right | 2.4 km || 
|-id=520 bgcolor=#d6d6d6
| 563520 ||  || — || August 15, 2013 || Haleakala || Pan-STARRS ||  || align=right | 1.9 km || 
|-id=521 bgcolor=#E9E9E9
| 563521 ||  || — || February 10, 2007 || Mount Lemmon || Mount Lemmon Survey ||  || align=right | 1.4 km || 
|-id=522 bgcolor=#d6d6d6
| 563522 ||  || — || February 5, 2016 || Haleakala || Pan-STARRS ||  || align=right | 2.6 km || 
|-id=523 bgcolor=#d6d6d6
| 563523 ||  || — || February 5, 2016 || Haleakala || Pan-STARRS ||  || align=right | 2.4 km || 
|-id=524 bgcolor=#E9E9E9
| 563524 ||  || — || February 9, 2016 || Haleakala || Pan-STARRS ||  || align=right | 1.4 km || 
|-id=525 bgcolor=#E9E9E9
| 563525 ||  || — || October 14, 2009 || Mount Lemmon || Mount Lemmon Survey ||  || align=right | 1.7 km || 
|-id=526 bgcolor=#d6d6d6
| 563526 ||  || — || March 6, 2011 || Wildberg || R. Apitzsch ||  || align=right | 2.3 km || 
|-id=527 bgcolor=#d6d6d6
| 563527 ||  || — || November 11, 2009 || Kitt Peak || Spacewatch ||  || align=right | 1.9 km || 
|-id=528 bgcolor=#E9E9E9
| 563528 ||  || — || March 2, 2011 || Mount Lemmon || Mount Lemmon Survey ||  || align=right | 1.8 km || 
|-id=529 bgcolor=#E9E9E9
| 563529 ||  || — || February 5, 2016 || Haleakala || Pan-STARRS ||  || align=right | 1.8 km || 
|-id=530 bgcolor=#E9E9E9
| 563530 ||  || — || December 10, 2014 || Mount Lemmon || Mount Lemmon Survey ||  || align=right | 1.8 km || 
|-id=531 bgcolor=#E9E9E9
| 563531 ||  || — || October 14, 2009 || Catalina || CSS ||  || align=right | 2.4 km || 
|-id=532 bgcolor=#E9E9E9
| 563532 ||  || — || April 24, 2012 || Mount Lemmon || Mount Lemmon Survey ||  || align=right | 1.6 km || 
|-id=533 bgcolor=#E9E9E9
| 563533 ||  || — || February 10, 2011 || Mount Lemmon || Mount Lemmon Survey ||  || align=right | 1.4 km || 
|-id=534 bgcolor=#E9E9E9
| 563534 ||  || — || March 10, 2011 || Mount Lemmon || Mount Lemmon Survey ||  || align=right | 2.1 km || 
|-id=535 bgcolor=#d6d6d6
| 563535 ||  || — || March 8, 2005 || Kitt Peak || Spacewatch ||  || align=right | 2.8 km || 
|-id=536 bgcolor=#E9E9E9
| 563536 ||  || — || August 27, 2013 || Haleakala || Pan-STARRS ||  || align=right | 2.3 km || 
|-id=537 bgcolor=#E9E9E9
| 563537 ||  || — || March 26, 2003 || Kitt Peak || Spacewatch ||  || align=right | 3.0 km || 
|-id=538 bgcolor=#d6d6d6
| 563538 ||  || — || September 29, 2008 || Mount Lemmon || Mount Lemmon Survey ||  || align=right | 2.9 km || 
|-id=539 bgcolor=#d6d6d6
| 563539 ||  || — || September 29, 2003 || Kitt Peak || Spacewatch ||  || align=right | 2.2 km || 
|-id=540 bgcolor=#E9E9E9
| 563540 ||  || — || October 9, 2005 || Kitt Peak || Spacewatch ||  || align=right | 1.4 km || 
|-id=541 bgcolor=#E9E9E9
| 563541 ||  || — || January 23, 2011 || Mount Lemmon || Mount Lemmon Survey ||  || align=right | 1.8 km || 
|-id=542 bgcolor=#E9E9E9
| 563542 ||  || — || April 16, 2012 || Haleakala || Pan-STARRS ||  || align=right | 1.6 km || 
|-id=543 bgcolor=#d6d6d6
| 563543 ||  || — || August 13, 2013 || Kitt Peak || Spacewatch ||  || align=right | 2.5 km || 
|-id=544 bgcolor=#d6d6d6
| 563544 ||  || — || August 25, 2003 || Cerro Tololo || Cerro Tololo Obs. ||  || align=right | 2.2 km || 
|-id=545 bgcolor=#d6d6d6
| 563545 ||  || — || March 13, 2005 || Mount Lemmon || Mount Lemmon Survey ||  || align=right | 3.0 km || 
|-id=546 bgcolor=#E9E9E9
| 563546 ||  || — || October 1, 2014 || Haleakala || Pan-STARRS ||  || align=right | 1.8 km || 
|-id=547 bgcolor=#E9E9E9
| 563547 ||  || — || October 1, 2014 || Haleakala || Pan-STARRS ||  || align=right | 1.1 km || 
|-id=548 bgcolor=#E9E9E9
| 563548 ||  || — || October 28, 2014 || Haleakala || Pan-STARRS ||  || align=right | 1.7 km || 
|-id=549 bgcolor=#E9E9E9
| 563549 ||  || — || August 22, 2014 || Haleakala || Pan-STARRS ||  || align=right data-sort-value="0.80" | 800 m || 
|-id=550 bgcolor=#E9E9E9
| 563550 ||  || — || January 30, 2011 || Mount Lemmon || Mount Lemmon Survey ||  || align=right | 2.3 km || 
|-id=551 bgcolor=#E9E9E9
| 563551 ||  || — || January 14, 2011 || Mount Lemmon || Mount Lemmon Survey ||  || align=right | 1.5 km || 
|-id=552 bgcolor=#d6d6d6
| 563552 ||  || — || October 25, 2014 || Mount Lemmon || Mount Lemmon Survey ||  || align=right | 2.3 km || 
|-id=553 bgcolor=#E9E9E9
| 563553 ||  || — || January 13, 2011 || Mount Lemmon || Mount Lemmon Survey ||  || align=right | 1.7 km || 
|-id=554 bgcolor=#E9E9E9
| 563554 ||  || — || April 1, 2012 || Mount Lemmon || Mount Lemmon Survey ||  || align=right | 2.1 km || 
|-id=555 bgcolor=#d6d6d6
| 563555 ||  || — || October 28, 2014 || Haleakala || Pan-STARRS ||  || align=right | 2.5 km || 
|-id=556 bgcolor=#E9E9E9
| 563556 ||  || — || July 16, 2013 || Haleakala || Pan-STARRS ||  || align=right | 1.2 km || 
|-id=557 bgcolor=#d6d6d6
| 563557 ||  || — || January 30, 2011 || Haleakala || Pan-STARRS ||  || align=right | 1.8 km || 
|-id=558 bgcolor=#E9E9E9
| 563558 ||  || — || September 7, 2004 || Kitt Peak || Spacewatch ||  || align=right | 1.7 km || 
|-id=559 bgcolor=#E9E9E9
| 563559 ||  || — || May 13, 2012 || Mount Lemmon || Mount Lemmon Survey ||  || align=right | 1.8 km || 
|-id=560 bgcolor=#E9E9E9
| 563560 ||  || — || February 7, 2011 || Mount Lemmon || Mount Lemmon Survey ||  || align=right | 1.9 km || 
|-id=561 bgcolor=#d6d6d6
| 563561 ||  || — || September 1, 2013 || Haleakala || Pan-STARRS ||  || align=right | 2.5 km || 
|-id=562 bgcolor=#d6d6d6
| 563562 ||  || — || February 11, 2004 || Kitt Peak || Spacewatch ||  || align=right | 2.8 km || 
|-id=563 bgcolor=#E9E9E9
| 563563 ||  || — || December 25, 2005 || Mount Lemmon || Mount Lemmon Survey ||  || align=right | 1.7 km || 
|-id=564 bgcolor=#d6d6d6
| 563564 ||  || — || March 6, 2011 || Kitt Peak || Mount Lemmon Survey ||  || align=right | 2.3 km || 
|-id=565 bgcolor=#d6d6d6
| 563565 ||  || — || February 9, 2011 || Bergisch Gladbach || W. Bickel ||  || align=right | 2.1 km || 
|-id=566 bgcolor=#E9E9E9
| 563566 ||  || — || October 25, 2005 || Kitt Peak || Spacewatch ||  || align=right | 1.5 km || 
|-id=567 bgcolor=#E9E9E9
| 563567 ||  || — || October 7, 2004 || Kitt Peak || Spacewatch ||  || align=right | 1.9 km || 
|-id=568 bgcolor=#d6d6d6
| 563568 ||  || — || August 9, 2013 || Haleakala || Pan-STARRS ||  || align=right | 2.2 km || 
|-id=569 bgcolor=#E9E9E9
| 563569 ||  || — || April 15, 2012 || Haleakala || Pan-STARRS ||  || align=right | 1.1 km || 
|-id=570 bgcolor=#d6d6d6
| 563570 ||  || — || November 26, 2014 || Haleakala || Pan-STARRS ||  || align=right | 2.4 km || 
|-id=571 bgcolor=#E9E9E9
| 563571 ||  || — || February 13, 2011 || Mount Lemmon || Mount Lemmon Survey ||  || align=right | 1.7 km || 
|-id=572 bgcolor=#E9E9E9
| 563572 ||  || — || August 28, 2000 || Cerro Tololo || R. Millis, L. H. Wasserman ||  || align=right | 2.0 km || 
|-id=573 bgcolor=#E9E9E9
| 563573 ||  || — || January 26, 2011 || Mount Lemmon || Mount Lemmon Survey ||  || align=right | 2.1 km || 
|-id=574 bgcolor=#E9E9E9
| 563574 ||  || — || February 10, 2016 || Haleakala || Pan-STARRS ||  || align=right data-sort-value="0.93" | 930 m || 
|-id=575 bgcolor=#E9E9E9
| 563575 ||  || — || August 15, 2013 || Haleakala || Pan-STARRS ||  || align=right | 1.3 km || 
|-id=576 bgcolor=#d6d6d6
| 563576 ||  || — || March 11, 2011 || Kitt Peak || Spacewatch ||  || align=right | 1.7 km || 
|-id=577 bgcolor=#d6d6d6
| 563577 ||  || — || November 17, 2009 || Mount Lemmon || Mount Lemmon Survey ||  || align=right | 2.0 km || 
|-id=578 bgcolor=#d6d6d6
| 563578 ||  || — || January 19, 2015 || Haleakala || Pan-STARRS ||  || align=right | 2.1 km || 
|-id=579 bgcolor=#d6d6d6
| 563579 ||  || — || October 29, 2008 || Mount Lemmon || Mount Lemmon Survey ||  || align=right | 2.7 km || 
|-id=580 bgcolor=#E9E9E9
| 563580 ||  || — || November 26, 2013 || Nogales || M. Schwartz, P. R. Holvorcem ||  || align=right | 2.3 km || 
|-id=581 bgcolor=#E9E9E9
| 563581 ||  || — || January 27, 2007 || Kitt Peak || Spacewatch ||  || align=right | 1.6 km || 
|-id=582 bgcolor=#E9E9E9
| 563582 ||  || — || October 28, 2014 || Haleakala || Pan-STARRS ||  || align=right | 1.3 km || 
|-id=583 bgcolor=#d6d6d6
| 563583 ||  || — || February 11, 2016 || Haleakala || Pan-STARRS ||  || align=right | 2.0 km || 
|-id=584 bgcolor=#E9E9E9
| 563584 ||  || — || March 28, 2012 || Kitt Peak || Spacewatch ||  || align=right | 1.3 km || 
|-id=585 bgcolor=#E9E9E9
| 563585 ||  || — || February 25, 2007 || Kitt Peak || Spacewatch ||  || align=right | 1.6 km || 
|-id=586 bgcolor=#E9E9E9
| 563586 ||  || — || August 9, 2013 || Haleakala || Pan-STARRS ||  || align=right | 1.5 km || 
|-id=587 bgcolor=#E9E9E9
| 563587 ||  || — || February 20, 2012 || Haleakala || Pan-STARRS ||  || align=right | 1.3 km || 
|-id=588 bgcolor=#d6d6d6
| 563588 ||  || — || February 8, 2010 || Kitt Peak || Spacewatch ||  || align=right | 2.5 km || 
|-id=589 bgcolor=#d6d6d6
| 563589 ||  || — || January 22, 2015 || Kitt Peak || Pan-STARRS ||  || align=right | 2.5 km || 
|-id=590 bgcolor=#d6d6d6
| 563590 ||  || — || February 11, 2016 || Haleakala || Pan-STARRS ||  || align=right | 2.8 km || 
|-id=591 bgcolor=#d6d6d6
| 563591 ||  || — || November 18, 2014 || Mount Lemmon || Mount Lemmon Survey ||  || align=right | 2.7 km || 
|-id=592 bgcolor=#d6d6d6
| 563592 ||  || — || May 21, 2011 || Mount Lemmon || Mount Lemmon Survey ||  || align=right | 2.4 km || 
|-id=593 bgcolor=#d6d6d6
| 563593 ||  || — || September 18, 2001 || Mount Lemmon || SDSS ||  || align=right | 3.4 km || 
|-id=594 bgcolor=#d6d6d6
| 563594 ||  || — || October 15, 2013 || Oukaimeden || M. Ory ||  || align=right | 2.4 km || 
|-id=595 bgcolor=#d6d6d6
| 563595 ||  || — || October 5, 2013 || Haleakala || Pan-STARRS ||  || align=right | 2.4 km || 
|-id=596 bgcolor=#E9E9E9
| 563596 ||  || — || February 27, 2012 || Haleakala || Pan-STARRS ||  || align=right | 1.6 km || 
|-id=597 bgcolor=#E9E9E9
| 563597 ||  || — || January 13, 2011 || Kitt Peak || Spacewatch ||  || align=right | 1.9 km || 
|-id=598 bgcolor=#E9E9E9
| 563598 ||  || — || November 28, 2014 || Mount Lemmon || Mount Lemmon Survey ||  || align=right | 1.5 km || 
|-id=599 bgcolor=#d6d6d6
| 563599 ||  || — || August 25, 2012 || Kitt Peak || Spacewatch ||  || align=right | 2.9 km || 
|-id=600 bgcolor=#d6d6d6
| 563600 ||  || — || November 17, 2014 || Haleakala || Pan-STARRS ||  || align=right | 2.8 km || 
|}

563601–563700 

|-bgcolor=#E9E9E9
| 563601 ||  || — || November 14, 2010 || Mount Lemmon || Mount Lemmon Survey ||  || align=right | 1.3 km || 
|-id=602 bgcolor=#d6d6d6
| 563602 ||  || — || February 14, 2016 || Haleakala || Pan-STARRS ||  || align=right | 2.9 km || 
|-id=603 bgcolor=#d6d6d6
| 563603 ||  || — || December 24, 2014 || Mount Lemmon || Mount Lemmon Survey ||  || align=right | 2.8 km || 
|-id=604 bgcolor=#d6d6d6
| 563604 ||  || — || November 26, 2014 || Haleakala || Pan-STARRS ||  || align=right | 2.4 km || 
|-id=605 bgcolor=#E9E9E9
| 563605 ||  || — || February 2, 2016 || Siding Spring || Pan-STARRS ||  || align=right | 1.4 km || 
|-id=606 bgcolor=#d6d6d6
| 563606 ||  || — || May 30, 2006 || Mount Lemmon || Mount Lemmon Survey ||  || align=right | 2.4 km || 
|-id=607 bgcolor=#d6d6d6
| 563607 ||  || — || February 11, 2016 || Haleakala || Pan-STARRS ||  || align=right | 2.5 km || 
|-id=608 bgcolor=#d6d6d6
| 563608 ||  || — || January 20, 2015 || Haleakala || Pan-STARRS ||  || align=right | 2.8 km || 
|-id=609 bgcolor=#E9E9E9
| 563609 ||  || — || October 1, 2014 || Kitt Peak || Spacewatch ||  || align=right data-sort-value="0.67" | 670 m || 
|-id=610 bgcolor=#E9E9E9
| 563610 ||  || — || March 3, 2011 || Mount Lemmon || Mount Lemmon Survey ||  || align=right | 1.6 km || 
|-id=611 bgcolor=#d6d6d6
| 563611 ||  || — || February 5, 2016 || Haleakala || Pan-STARRS ||  || align=right | 2.8 km || 
|-id=612 bgcolor=#fefefe
| 563612 ||  || — || February 6, 2016 || Haleakala || Pan-STARRS ||  || align=right data-sort-value="0.46" | 460 m || 
|-id=613 bgcolor=#d6d6d6
| 563613 ||  || — || February 14, 2016 || Haleakala || Pan-STARRS ||  || align=right | 2.5 km || 
|-id=614 bgcolor=#FA8072
| 563614 ||  || — || June 27, 2014 || Haleakala || Pan-STARRS || H || align=right data-sort-value="0.70" | 700 m || 
|-id=615 bgcolor=#E9E9E9
| 563615 ||  || — || July 31, 2014 || Haleakala || Pan-STARRS ||  || align=right | 2.0 km || 
|-id=616 bgcolor=#E9E9E9
| 563616 ||  || — || March 10, 1999 || Kitt Peak || Spacewatch ||  || align=right | 1.6 km || 
|-id=617 bgcolor=#E9E9E9
| 563617 ||  || — || October 19, 2010 || Mount Lemmon || Mount Lemmon Survey ||  || align=right | 1.1 km || 
|-id=618 bgcolor=#E9E9E9
| 563618 ||  || — || January 17, 2016 || Haleakala || Pan-STARRS ||  || align=right | 1.8 km || 
|-id=619 bgcolor=#E9E9E9
| 563619 ||  || — || January 4, 2016 || Haleakala || Pan-STARRS ||  || align=right | 1.1 km || 
|-id=620 bgcolor=#E9E9E9
| 563620 ||  || — || November 18, 2006 || Kitt Peak || Spacewatch ||  || align=right | 1.1 km || 
|-id=621 bgcolor=#E9E9E9
| 563621 ||  || — || January 27, 2007 || Mount Lemmon || Mount Lemmon Survey ||  || align=right | 2.7 km || 
|-id=622 bgcolor=#E9E9E9
| 563622 ||  || — || August 20, 2014 || Haleakala || Pan-STARRS ||  || align=right | 1.1 km || 
|-id=623 bgcolor=#E9E9E9
| 563623 ||  || — || September 8, 1996 || Kitt Peak || Spacewatch ||  || align=right | 1.3 km || 
|-id=624 bgcolor=#E9E9E9
| 563624 ||  || — || March 10, 2007 || Cima Ekar || Spacewatch ||  || align=right | 2.3 km || 
|-id=625 bgcolor=#E9E9E9
| 563625 ||  || — || August 12, 2013 || Haleakala || Pan-STARRS ||  || align=right | 1.5 km || 
|-id=626 bgcolor=#d6d6d6
| 563626 ||  || — || April 15, 2012 || Haleakala || Pan-STARRS ||  || align=right | 2.9 km || 
|-id=627 bgcolor=#E9E9E9
| 563627 ||  || — || August 16, 2009 || Kitt Peak || Spacewatch ||  || align=right | 2.2 km || 
|-id=628 bgcolor=#E9E9E9
| 563628 ||  || — || March 26, 2007 || Kitt Peak || Spacewatch ||  || align=right | 2.0 km || 
|-id=629 bgcolor=#E9E9E9
| 563629 ||  || — || August 20, 2009 || Kitt Peak || Spacewatch ||  || align=right | 1.6 km || 
|-id=630 bgcolor=#E9E9E9
| 563630 ||  || — || January 10, 2007 || Kitt Peak || Spacewatch ||  || align=right | 2.4 km || 
|-id=631 bgcolor=#E9E9E9
| 563631 ||  || — || February 22, 2007 || Kitt Peak || Spacewatch ||  || align=right | 1.5 km || 
|-id=632 bgcolor=#d6d6d6
| 563632 ||  || — || January 26, 2011 || Kitt Peak || Spacewatch ||  || align=right | 2.7 km || 
|-id=633 bgcolor=#E9E9E9
| 563633 ||  || — || October 28, 2014 || Haleakala || Pan-STARRS ||  || align=right | 1.8 km || 
|-id=634 bgcolor=#E9E9E9
| 563634 ||  || — || February 6, 2002 || Kitt Peak || R. Millis, M. W. Buie ||  || align=right | 1.6 km || 
|-id=635 bgcolor=#E9E9E9
| 563635 ||  || — || October 1, 2014 || Haleakala || Pan-STARRS ||  || align=right | 1.9 km || 
|-id=636 bgcolor=#d6d6d6
| 563636 ||  || — || October 9, 2008 || Mount Lemmon || Mount Lemmon Survey ||  || align=right | 3.1 km || 
|-id=637 bgcolor=#E9E9E9
| 563637 ||  || — || February 27, 2016 || Mount Lemmon || Mount Lemmon Survey ||  || align=right | 1.9 km || 
|-id=638 bgcolor=#E9E9E9
| 563638 ||  || — || March 1, 2012 || Mount Lemmon || Mount Lemmon Survey ||  || align=right | 1.5 km || 
|-id=639 bgcolor=#E9E9E9
| 563639 ||  || — || April 30, 2012 || Kitt Peak || Spacewatch ||  || align=right | 1.8 km || 
|-id=640 bgcolor=#fefefe
| 563640 ||  || — || February 5, 2016 || Haleakala || Pan-STARRS ||  || align=right data-sort-value="0.55" | 550 m || 
|-id=641 bgcolor=#E9E9E9
| 563641 ||  || — || September 20, 2008 || Mount Lemmon || Mount Lemmon Survey ||  || align=right | 2.4 km || 
|-id=642 bgcolor=#E9E9E9
| 563642 ||  || — || December 13, 2015 || Haleakala || Pan-STARRS ||  || align=right | 2.0 km || 
|-id=643 bgcolor=#d6d6d6
| 563643 ||  || — || January 6, 2006 || Catalina || CSS ||  || align=right | 2.9 km || 
|-id=644 bgcolor=#E9E9E9
| 563644 ||  || — || November 17, 2014 || Haleakala || Pan-STARRS ||  || align=right | 1.9 km || 
|-id=645 bgcolor=#d6d6d6
| 563645 ||  || — || December 17, 2009 || Mount Lemmon || Mount Lemmon Survey ||  || align=right | 2.1 km || 
|-id=646 bgcolor=#E9E9E9
| 563646 ||  || — || January 8, 2016 || Haleakala || Pan-STARRS ||  || align=right | 1.5 km || 
|-id=647 bgcolor=#d6d6d6
| 563647 ||  || — || September 24, 2014 || Haleakala || Pan-STARRS ||  || align=right | 2.8 km || 
|-id=648 bgcolor=#d6d6d6
| 563648 ||  || — || March 29, 2011 || Mount Lemmon || Mount Lemmon Survey ||  || align=right | 2.0 km || 
|-id=649 bgcolor=#E9E9E9
| 563649 ||  || — || August 23, 2008 || Kitt Peak || SSS ||  || align=right | 2.9 km || 
|-id=650 bgcolor=#E9E9E9
| 563650 ||  || — || April 6, 2008 || Kitt Peak || Spacewatch ||  || align=right | 1.4 km || 
|-id=651 bgcolor=#E9E9E9
| 563651 ||  || — || February 28, 2012 || Haleakala || Pan-STARRS ||  || align=right | 1.4 km || 
|-id=652 bgcolor=#d6d6d6
| 563652 ||  || — || February 27, 2006 || Mount Lemmon || Mount Lemmon Survey ||  || align=right | 3.5 km || 
|-id=653 bgcolor=#E9E9E9
| 563653 ||  || — || August 27, 2014 || Haleakala || Pan-STARRS ||  || align=right | 1.3 km || 
|-id=654 bgcolor=#E9E9E9
| 563654 ||  || — || February 26, 2012 || Kitt Peak || Spacewatch ||  || align=right | 1.3 km || 
|-id=655 bgcolor=#E9E9E9
| 563655 ||  || — || September 16, 2014 || Haleakala || Pan-STARRS ||  || align=right | 1.7 km || 
|-id=656 bgcolor=#E9E9E9
| 563656 ||  || — || March 13, 2012 || Mount Lemmon || Mount Lemmon Survey ||  || align=right | 1.4 km || 
|-id=657 bgcolor=#d6d6d6
| 563657 ||  || — || November 26, 2009 || Mount Lemmon || Mount Lemmon Survey ||  || align=right | 2.8 km || 
|-id=658 bgcolor=#E9E9E9
| 563658 ||  || — || May 3, 2003 || Kitt Peak || Spacewatch ||  || align=right | 1.5 km || 
|-id=659 bgcolor=#E9E9E9
| 563659 ||  || — || March 14, 2012 || Mount Lemmon || Mount Lemmon Survey ||  || align=right | 1.8 km || 
|-id=660 bgcolor=#E9E9E9
| 563660 ||  || — || October 1, 2005 || Kitt Peak || Spacewatch ||  || align=right | 1.8 km || 
|-id=661 bgcolor=#d6d6d6
| 563661 ||  || — || February 4, 2006 || Mount Lemmon || Mount Lemmon Survey ||  || align=right | 2.2 km || 
|-id=662 bgcolor=#E9E9E9
| 563662 ||  || — || March 10, 2007 || Mount Lemmon || Mount Lemmon Survey ||  || align=right | 1.8 km || 
|-id=663 bgcolor=#d6d6d6
| 563663 ||  || — || February 4, 2006 || Kitt Peak || Spacewatch ||  || align=right | 2.2 km || 
|-id=664 bgcolor=#d6d6d6
| 563664 ||  || — || April 12, 2011 || Mount Lemmon || Mount Lemmon Survey ||  || align=right | 2.0 km || 
|-id=665 bgcolor=#d6d6d6
| 563665 ||  || — || May 25, 2007 || Mount Lemmon || Mount Lemmon Survey ||  || align=right | 2.7 km || 
|-id=666 bgcolor=#fefefe
| 563666 ||  || — || February 18, 2016 || Mount Lemmon || Mount Lemmon Survey || H || align=right data-sort-value="0.64" | 640 m || 
|-id=667 bgcolor=#d6d6d6
| 563667 ||  || — || September 23, 2008 || Kitt Peak || Spacewatch ||  || align=right | 2.8 km || 
|-id=668 bgcolor=#d6d6d6
| 563668 ||  || — || February 23, 2011 || Kitt Peak || Spacewatch ||  || align=right | 2.4 km || 
|-id=669 bgcolor=#d6d6d6
| 563669 ||  || — || November 26, 2014 || Haleakala || Pan-STARRS ||  || align=right | 3.1 km || 
|-id=670 bgcolor=#d6d6d6
| 563670 ||  || — || February 12, 2011 || Mount Lemmon || Mount Lemmon Survey ||  || align=right | 1.9 km || 
|-id=671 bgcolor=#E9E9E9
| 563671 ||  || — || April 18, 2007 || Mount Lemmon || Mount Lemmon Survey ||  || align=right | 2.1 km || 
|-id=672 bgcolor=#E9E9E9
| 563672 ||  || — || April 15, 2012 || Haleakala || Pan-STARRS ||  || align=right | 1.8 km || 
|-id=673 bgcolor=#E9E9E9
| 563673 ||  || — || May 1, 2012 || Kitt Peak || Spacewatch ||  || align=right | 1.4 km || 
|-id=674 bgcolor=#E9E9E9
| 563674 ||  || — || January 27, 2007 || Kitt Peak || Spacewatch ||  || align=right | 1.1 km || 
|-id=675 bgcolor=#d6d6d6
| 563675 ||  || — || March 27, 2011 || Mount Lemmon || Mount Lemmon Survey ||  || align=right | 1.7 km || 
|-id=676 bgcolor=#d6d6d6
| 563676 ||  || — || October 24, 2009 || Catalina || CSS ||  || align=right | 2.6 km || 
|-id=677 bgcolor=#E9E9E9
| 563677 ||  || — || February 29, 2016 || Haleakala || Pan-STARRS ||  || align=right | 2.0 km || 
|-id=678 bgcolor=#fefefe
| 563678 ||  || — || March 1, 2016 || Haleakala || Pan-STARRS || H || align=right data-sort-value="0.56" | 560 m || 
|-id=679 bgcolor=#E9E9E9
| 563679 ||  || — || August 8, 2004 || Anderson Mesa || LONEOS ||  || align=right | 2.4 km || 
|-id=680 bgcolor=#d6d6d6
| 563680 ||  || — || April 4, 2002 || Palomar || NEAT ||  || align=right | 3.1 km || 
|-id=681 bgcolor=#d6d6d6
| 563681 ||  || — || November 21, 2014 || Haleakala || Pan-STARRS ||  || align=right | 3.1 km || 
|-id=682 bgcolor=#d6d6d6
| 563682 ||  || — || January 14, 2010 || Mount Lemmon || Mount Lemmon Survey ||  || align=right | 2.8 km || 
|-id=683 bgcolor=#E9E9E9
| 563683 ||  || — || January 18, 2012 || Kitt Peak || Spacewatch ||  || align=right | 1.5 km || 
|-id=684 bgcolor=#E9E9E9
| 563684 ||  || — || October 16, 2009 || Mount Lemmon || Mount Lemmon Survey ||  || align=right | 1.8 km || 
|-id=685 bgcolor=#E9E9E9
| 563685 ||  || — || March 27, 2012 || Mount Lemmon || Mount Lemmon Survey ||  || align=right | 2.0 km || 
|-id=686 bgcolor=#E9E9E9
| 563686 ||  || — || July 8, 2003 || Kitt Peak || Spacewatch ||  || align=right | 2.1 km || 
|-id=687 bgcolor=#d6d6d6
| 563687 ||  || — || October 11, 2004 || Kitt Peak || L. H. Wasserman, J. R. Lovering ||  || align=right | 2.6 km || 
|-id=688 bgcolor=#E9E9E9
| 563688 ||  || — || November 22, 2006 || Mount Lemmon || Mount Lemmon Survey ||  || align=right | 1.2 km || 
|-id=689 bgcolor=#E9E9E9
| 563689 ||  || — || October 2, 2014 || Haleakala || Pan-STARRS ||  || align=right | 1.8 km || 
|-id=690 bgcolor=#d6d6d6
| 563690 ||  || — || February 17, 2010 || Catalina || CSS ||  || align=right | 3.1 km || 
|-id=691 bgcolor=#d6d6d6
| 563691 ||  || — || November 19, 2003 || Palomar || NEAT ||  || align=right | 3.5 km || 
|-id=692 bgcolor=#d6d6d6
| 563692 ||  || — || March 26, 2011 || Palomar || Mount Lemmon Survey ||  || align=right | 3.1 km || 
|-id=693 bgcolor=#d6d6d6
| 563693 ||  || — || November 23, 2009 || Mount Lemmon || Mount Lemmon Survey ||  || align=right | 2.1 km || 
|-id=694 bgcolor=#d6d6d6
| 563694 ||  || — || October 30, 2014 || Haleakala || Pan-STARRS ||  || align=right | 2.2 km || 
|-id=695 bgcolor=#E9E9E9
| 563695 ||  || — || April 20, 2012 || Haleakala || Pan-STARRS ||  || align=right | 1.3 km || 
|-id=696 bgcolor=#d6d6d6
| 563696 ||  || — || September 27, 2003 || Apache Point || SDSS Collaboration ||  || align=right | 2.4 km || 
|-id=697 bgcolor=#d6d6d6
| 563697 ||  || — || November 17, 2014 || Haleakala || Pan-STARRS ||  || align=right | 2.8 km || 
|-id=698 bgcolor=#E9E9E9
| 563698 ||  || — || May 20, 2012 || Mount Lemmon || Mount Lemmon Survey ||  || align=right | 2.0 km || 
|-id=699 bgcolor=#E9E9E9
| 563699 ||  || — || November 7, 2010 || Mount Lemmon || Mount Lemmon Survey ||  || align=right | 1.7 km || 
|-id=700 bgcolor=#E9E9E9
| 563700 ||  || — || October 2, 2014 || Haleakala || Pan-STARRS ||  || align=right | 1.4 km || 
|}

563701–563800 

|-bgcolor=#E9E9E9
| 563701 ||  || — || October 7, 2014 || Haleakala || Pan-STARRS ||  || align=right | 2.1 km || 
|-id=702 bgcolor=#d6d6d6
| 563702 ||  || — || May 23, 2011 || Mount Lemmon || Mount Lemmon Survey ||  || align=right | 3.1 km || 
|-id=703 bgcolor=#d6d6d6
| 563703 ||  || — || May 24, 2006 || Mount Lemmon || Mount Lemmon Survey ||  || align=right | 2.4 km || 
|-id=704 bgcolor=#E9E9E9
| 563704 ||  || — || October 3, 2014 || Mount Lemmon || Mount Lemmon Survey ||  || align=right | 1.9 km || 
|-id=705 bgcolor=#E9E9E9
| 563705 ||  || — || December 8, 2010 || Kitt Peak || Spacewatch ||  || align=right | 1.6 km || 
|-id=706 bgcolor=#d6d6d6
| 563706 ||  || — || November 25, 2014 || Haleakala || Pan-STARRS ||  || align=right | 1.9 km || 
|-id=707 bgcolor=#d6d6d6
| 563707 ||  || — || September 28, 2013 || Piszkesteto || K. Sárneczky ||  || align=right | 2.8 km || 
|-id=708 bgcolor=#d6d6d6
| 563708 ||  || — || November 19, 2008 || Mount Lemmon || Mount Lemmon Survey ||  || align=right | 3.0 km || 
|-id=709 bgcolor=#d6d6d6
| 563709 ||  || — || October 22, 2008 || Kitt Peak || Spacewatch ||  || align=right | 2.8 km || 
|-id=710 bgcolor=#d6d6d6
| 563710 ||  || — || October 23, 2013 || Haleakala || Pan-STARRS ||  || align=right | 2.6 km || 
|-id=711 bgcolor=#E9E9E9
| 563711 ||  || — || September 20, 2014 || Haleakala || Pan-STARRS ||  || align=right | 1.3 km || 
|-id=712 bgcolor=#d6d6d6
| 563712 ||  || — || November 22, 2014 || Mount Lemmon || Mount Lemmon Survey ||  || align=right | 2.1 km || 
|-id=713 bgcolor=#d6d6d6
| 563713 ||  || — || November 6, 2008 || Mount Lemmon || Mount Lemmon Survey ||  || align=right | 2.9 km || 
|-id=714 bgcolor=#d6d6d6
| 563714 ||  || — || November 19, 2008 || Mount Lemmon || Mount Lemmon Survey ||  || align=right | 2.4 km || 
|-id=715 bgcolor=#d6d6d6
| 563715 ||  || — || March 3, 2016 || Haleakala || Pan-STARRS ||  || align=right | 2.9 km || 
|-id=716 bgcolor=#d6d6d6
| 563716 Szinyeimersepál ||  ||  || October 31, 2013 || Piszkesteto || S. Kürti, K. Sárneczky ||  || align=right | 3.2 km || 
|-id=717 bgcolor=#d6d6d6
| 563717 ||  || — || October 6, 2013 || Mount Lemmon || Mount Lemmon Survey ||  || align=right | 3.5 km || 
|-id=718 bgcolor=#d6d6d6
| 563718 ||  || — || December 15, 2014 || Mount Lemmon || Mount Lemmon Survey ||  || align=right | 2.5 km || 
|-id=719 bgcolor=#d6d6d6
| 563719 ||  || — || October 21, 2008 || Kitt Peak || Mount Lemmon Survey ||  || align=right | 2.3 km || 
|-id=720 bgcolor=#E9E9E9
| 563720 ||  || — || January 28, 2007 || Kitt Peak || Spacewatch ||  || align=right | 2.1 km || 
|-id=721 bgcolor=#E9E9E9
| 563721 ||  || — || September 22, 2009 || Kitt Peak || Spacewatch ||  || align=right | 1.9 km || 
|-id=722 bgcolor=#d6d6d6
| 563722 ||  || — || February 19, 2001 || Kitt Peak || Spacewatch ||  || align=right | 2.1 km || 
|-id=723 bgcolor=#d6d6d6
| 563723 ||  || — || October 24, 2005 || Mauna Kea || Mauna Kea Obs. ||  || align=right | 3.3 km || 
|-id=724 bgcolor=#E9E9E9
| 563724 ||  || — || December 19, 2001 || Palomar || NEAT ||  || align=right | 1.9 km || 
|-id=725 bgcolor=#fefefe
| 563725 ||  || — || February 4, 2016 || Haleakala || Pan-STARRS || H || align=right data-sort-value="0.72" | 720 m || 
|-id=726 bgcolor=#E9E9E9
| 563726 ||  || — || November 27, 2014 || Haleakala || Pan-STARRS ||  || align=right | 1.1 km || 
|-id=727 bgcolor=#d6d6d6
| 563727 ||  || — || April 15, 1996 || Kitt Peak || Spacewatch ||  || align=right | 3.4 km || 
|-id=728 bgcolor=#E9E9E9
| 563728 ||  || — || January 27, 2011 || Mount Lemmon || Mount Lemmon Survey ||  || align=right | 1.3 km || 
|-id=729 bgcolor=#d6d6d6
| 563729 ||  || — || November 28, 2014 || Mount Lemmon || Mount Lemmon Survey ||  || align=right | 2.2 km || 
|-id=730 bgcolor=#d6d6d6
| 563730 ||  || — || November 21, 2003 || Kitt Peak || Spacewatch ||  || align=right | 2.5 km || 
|-id=731 bgcolor=#E9E9E9
| 563731 ||  || — || August 19, 2014 || Haleakala || Pan-STARRS ||  || align=right | 1.5 km || 
|-id=732 bgcolor=#E9E9E9
| 563732 ||  || — || December 30, 2005 || Kitt Peak || Spacewatch ||  || align=right | 2.0 km || 
|-id=733 bgcolor=#E9E9E9
| 563733 ||  || — || October 29, 2005 || Kitt Peak || Spacewatch ||  || align=right | 2.3 km || 
|-id=734 bgcolor=#d6d6d6
| 563734 ||  || — || October 8, 2008 || Kitt Peak || Spacewatch ||  || align=right | 2.2 km || 
|-id=735 bgcolor=#d6d6d6
| 563735 ||  || — || September 5, 2008 || Kitt Peak || Spacewatch ||  || align=right | 2.4 km || 
|-id=736 bgcolor=#d6d6d6
| 563736 ||  || — || June 6, 2011 || Mount Lemmon || Mount Lemmon Survey ||  || align=right | 3.2 km || 
|-id=737 bgcolor=#d6d6d6
| 563737 ||  || — || April 27, 2011 || Mount Lemmon || Mount Lemmon Survey ||  || align=right | 2.6 km || 
|-id=738 bgcolor=#E9E9E9
| 563738 ||  || — || September 16, 2009 || Mount Lemmon || Mount Lemmon Survey ||  || align=right | 2.3 km || 
|-id=739 bgcolor=#fefefe
| 563739 ||  || — || January 3, 2012 || Mount Lemmon || Mount Lemmon Survey ||  || align=right data-sort-value="0.96" | 960 m || 
|-id=740 bgcolor=#E9E9E9
| 563740 ||  || — || November 12, 2010 || Kitt Peak || Spacewatch ||  || align=right | 1.6 km || 
|-id=741 bgcolor=#E9E9E9
| 563741 ||  || — || July 9, 2013 || Haleakala || Pan-STARRS ||  || align=right | 1.1 km || 
|-id=742 bgcolor=#E9E9E9
| 563742 ||  || — || August 5, 2004 || Palomar || NEAT ||  || align=right | 3.1 km || 
|-id=743 bgcolor=#E9E9E9
| 563743 ||  || — || September 3, 2010 || Mount Lemmon || Mount Lemmon Survey ||  || align=right | 1.2 km || 
|-id=744 bgcolor=#E9E9E9
| 563744 ||  || — || September 18, 2001 || Kitt Peak || Spacewatch ||  || align=right | 1.7 km || 
|-id=745 bgcolor=#E9E9E9
| 563745 ||  || — || March 1, 2008 || Kitt Peak || Spacewatch ||  || align=right data-sort-value="0.83" | 830 m || 
|-id=746 bgcolor=#E9E9E9
| 563746 ||  || — || October 28, 2005 || Mount Lemmon || Mount Lemmon Survey ||  || align=right | 1.8 km || 
|-id=747 bgcolor=#E9E9E9
| 563747 ||  || — || September 9, 2001 || Anderson Mesa || LONEOS ||  || align=right | 1.1 km || 
|-id=748 bgcolor=#E9E9E9
| 563748 ||  || — || September 1, 2005 || Palomar || NEAT ||  || align=right | 1.7 km || 
|-id=749 bgcolor=#E9E9E9
| 563749 ||  || — || April 19, 2004 || Kitt Peak || Spacewatch ||  || align=right | 1.3 km || 
|-id=750 bgcolor=#d6d6d6
| 563750 ||  || — || November 28, 2014 || Haleakala || Pan-STARRS ||  || align=right | 3.1 km || 
|-id=751 bgcolor=#d6d6d6
| 563751 ||  || — || November 17, 2014 || Haleakala || Pan-STARRS ||  || align=right | 2.5 km || 
|-id=752 bgcolor=#E9E9E9
| 563752 ||  || — || November 18, 2014 || Mount Lemmon || Mount Lemmon Survey ||  || align=right | 1.4 km || 
|-id=753 bgcolor=#d6d6d6
| 563753 ||  || — || October 7, 2008 || Mount Lemmon || Mount Lemmon Survey ||  || align=right | 2.5 km || 
|-id=754 bgcolor=#E9E9E9
| 563754 ||  || — || December 6, 2010 || Catalina || CSS ||  || align=right data-sort-value="0.97" | 970 m || 
|-id=755 bgcolor=#d6d6d6
| 563755 ||  || — || February 11, 2016 || Haleakala || Pan-STARRS ||  || align=right | 2.5 km || 
|-id=756 bgcolor=#E9E9E9
| 563756 ||  || — || September 30, 2013 || Siding Spring || CSS ||  || align=right | 1.7 km || 
|-id=757 bgcolor=#E9E9E9
| 563757 ||  || — || March 4, 2016 || Haleakala || Pan-STARRS ||  || align=right | 2.0 km || 
|-id=758 bgcolor=#d6d6d6
| 563758 ||  || — || October 2, 2013 || Mount Lemmon || Mount Lemmon Survey ||  || align=right | 3.5 km || 
|-id=759 bgcolor=#d6d6d6
| 563759 ||  || — || March 30, 2011 || Haleakala || Pan-STARRS ||  || align=right | 2.1 km || 
|-id=760 bgcolor=#E9E9E9
| 563760 ||  || — || March 3, 2016 || Haleakala || Pan-STARRS ||  || align=right | 2.2 km || 
|-id=761 bgcolor=#E9E9E9
| 563761 ||  || — || May 25, 2007 || Mount Lemmon || Mount Lemmon Survey ||  || align=right | 1.9 km || 
|-id=762 bgcolor=#d6d6d6
| 563762 ||  || — || November 20, 2003 || Kitt Peak || Spacewatch ||  || align=right | 2.8 km || 
|-id=763 bgcolor=#d6d6d6
| 563763 ||  || — || June 14, 2012 || Mount Lemmon || Mount Lemmon Survey ||  || align=right | 2.8 km || 
|-id=764 bgcolor=#d6d6d6
| 563764 ||  || — || February 12, 2016 || Haleakala || Pan-STARRS ||  || align=right | 2.5 km || 
|-id=765 bgcolor=#d6d6d6
| 563765 ||  || — || February 13, 2010 || Catalina || CSS ||  || align=right | 3.1 km || 
|-id=766 bgcolor=#d6d6d6
| 563766 ||  || — || October 20, 2007 || Mount Lemmon || Mount Lemmon Survey ||  || align=right | 2.7 km || 
|-id=767 bgcolor=#d6d6d6
| 563767 ||  || — || May 13, 2011 || Kitt Peak || Spacewatch ||  || align=right | 2.6 km || 
|-id=768 bgcolor=#fefefe
| 563768 ||  || — || July 2, 2014 || Haleakala || Pan-STARRS || H || align=right data-sort-value="0.56" | 560 m || 
|-id=769 bgcolor=#d6d6d6
| 563769 ||  || — || July 18, 2006 || Bergisch Gladbach || W. Bickel ||  || align=right | 2.9 km || 
|-id=770 bgcolor=#E9E9E9
| 563770 ||  || — || December 10, 2010 || Mount Lemmon || Mount Lemmon Survey ||  || align=right | 2.2 km || 
|-id=771 bgcolor=#E9E9E9
| 563771 ||  || — || February 28, 2012 || Haleakala || Pan-STARRS ||  || align=right data-sort-value="0.81" | 810 m || 
|-id=772 bgcolor=#E9E9E9
| 563772 ||  || — || September 16, 2009 || Kitt Peak || Spacewatch ||  || align=right | 2.0 km || 
|-id=773 bgcolor=#E9E9E9
| 563773 ||  || — || August 15, 2013 || Haleakala || Pan-STARRS ||  || align=right | 1.8 km || 
|-id=774 bgcolor=#E9E9E9
| 563774 ||  || — || August 15, 2013 || Haleakala || Pan-STARRS ||  || align=right | 1.5 km || 
|-id=775 bgcolor=#E9E9E9
| 563775 ||  || — || March 23, 2003 || Kitt Peak || Spacewatch ||  || align=right | 1.5 km || 
|-id=776 bgcolor=#E9E9E9
| 563776 ||  || — || December 1, 2005 || Kitt Peak || Spacewatch ||  || align=right | 2.7 km || 
|-id=777 bgcolor=#d6d6d6
| 563777 ||  || — || January 14, 2015 || Haleakala || Pan-STARRS ||  || align=right | 3.3 km || 
|-id=778 bgcolor=#d6d6d6
| 563778 ||  || — || December 3, 2014 || Haleakala || Pan-STARRS ||  || align=right | 2.4 km || 
|-id=779 bgcolor=#d6d6d6
| 563779 ||  || — || October 5, 2002 || Palomar || NEAT ||  || align=right | 3.1 km || 
|-id=780 bgcolor=#d6d6d6
| 563780 ||  || — || October 1, 2013 || Kitt Peak || Spacewatch ||  || align=right | 2.5 km || 
|-id=781 bgcolor=#fefefe
| 563781 ||  || — || August 28, 2014 || Haleakala || Pan-STARRS || H || align=right data-sort-value="0.50" | 500 m || 
|-id=782 bgcolor=#d6d6d6
| 563782 ||  || — || February 20, 2006 || Kitt Peak || Spacewatch ||  || align=right | 1.9 km || 
|-id=783 bgcolor=#E9E9E9
| 563783 ||  || — || January 14, 2011 || Mount Lemmon || Mount Lemmon Survey ||  || align=right | 1.4 km || 
|-id=784 bgcolor=#d6d6d6
| 563784 ||  || — || October 3, 2014 || Mount Lemmon || Mount Lemmon Survey ||  || align=right | 2.4 km || 
|-id=785 bgcolor=#E9E9E9
| 563785 ||  || — || December 9, 2010 || Mount Lemmon || Mount Lemmon Survey ||  || align=right | 1.7 km || 
|-id=786 bgcolor=#E9E9E9
| 563786 ||  || — || December 30, 2005 || Kitt Peak || Spacewatch ||  || align=right | 2.3 km || 
|-id=787 bgcolor=#d6d6d6
| 563787 ||  || — || November 2, 2008 || Kitt Peak || Spacewatch ||  || align=right | 2.7 km || 
|-id=788 bgcolor=#d6d6d6
| 563788 ||  || — || March 5, 2016 || Haleakala || Pan-STARRS ||  || align=right | 3.4 km || 
|-id=789 bgcolor=#d6d6d6
| 563789 ||  || — || November 27, 2009 || Mount Lemmon || Mount Lemmon Survey ||  || align=right | 2.9 km || 
|-id=790 bgcolor=#d6d6d6
| 563790 ||  || — || June 6, 2005 || Kitt Peak || Spacewatch ||  || align=right | 3.8 km || 
|-id=791 bgcolor=#d6d6d6
| 563791 ||  || — || November 24, 2008 || Kitt Peak || Spacewatch ||  || align=right | 2.5 km || 
|-id=792 bgcolor=#E9E9E9
| 563792 ||  || — || January 16, 2011 || Mount Lemmon || Mount Lemmon Survey ||  || align=right | 1.4 km || 
|-id=793 bgcolor=#d6d6d6
| 563793 ||  || — || March 10, 2005 || Mount Lemmon || Mount Lemmon Survey ||  || align=right | 2.4 km || 
|-id=794 bgcolor=#d6d6d6
| 563794 ||  || — || August 13, 2012 || Haleakala || Pan-STARRS ||  || align=right | 3.0 km || 
|-id=795 bgcolor=#d6d6d6
| 563795 ||  || — || November 11, 2007 || Kitt Peak || Mount Lemmon Survey ||  || align=right | 3.4 km || 
|-id=796 bgcolor=#d6d6d6
| 563796 ||  || — || April 17, 2005 || Kitt Peak || Spacewatch ||  || align=right | 2.9 km || 
|-id=797 bgcolor=#d6d6d6
| 563797 ||  || — || April 27, 2011 || Haleakala || Pan-STARRS ||  || align=right | 3.9 km || 
|-id=798 bgcolor=#d6d6d6
| 563798 ||  || — || September 8, 2004 || Apache Point || J. C. Barentine ||  || align=right | 2.8 km || 
|-id=799 bgcolor=#E9E9E9
| 563799 ||  || — || July 14, 2013 || Haleakala || Pan-STARRS ||  || align=right | 1.8 km || 
|-id=800 bgcolor=#E9E9E9
| 563800 ||  || — || July 30, 2013 || Kitt Peak || Spacewatch ||  || align=right | 1.9 km || 
|}

563801–563900 

|-bgcolor=#E9E9E9
| 563801 ||  || — || October 3, 2006 || Mount Lemmon || Mount Lemmon Survey ||  || align=right data-sort-value="0.76" | 760 m || 
|-id=802 bgcolor=#d6d6d6
| 563802 ||  || — || September 1, 2013 || Haleakala || Pan-STARRS ||  || align=right | 3.4 km || 
|-id=803 bgcolor=#E9E9E9
| 563803 ||  || — || October 3, 2014 || Mount Lemmon || Mount Lemmon Survey ||  || align=right | 2.1 km || 
|-id=804 bgcolor=#d6d6d6
| 563804 ||  || — || January 18, 2015 || Mount Lemmon || Mount Lemmon Survey ||  || align=right | 3.3 km || 
|-id=805 bgcolor=#E9E9E9
| 563805 ||  || — || January 13, 2015 || Haleakala || Pan-STARRS ||  || align=right | 1.7 km || 
|-id=806 bgcolor=#d6d6d6
| 563806 ||  || — || October 27, 2008 || Mount Lemmon || Mount Lemmon Survey ||  || align=right | 3.3 km || 
|-id=807 bgcolor=#d6d6d6
| 563807 ||  || — || May 20, 2012 || Palomar || Mount Lemmon Survey ||  || align=right | 3.4 km || 
|-id=808 bgcolor=#E9E9E9
| 563808 ||  || — || February 3, 2002 || Haleakala || AMOS ||  || align=right | 2.5 km || 
|-id=809 bgcolor=#E9E9E9
| 563809 ||  || — || April 16, 2008 || Mount Lemmon || Mount Lemmon Survey ||  || align=right | 1.5 km || 
|-id=810 bgcolor=#E9E9E9
| 563810 ||  || — || December 30, 2010 || Piszkesteto || Z. Kuli, K. Sárneczky ||  || align=right | 2.0 km || 
|-id=811 bgcolor=#d6d6d6
| 563811 ||  || — || December 10, 2014 || Mount Lemmon || Mount Lemmon Survey ||  || align=right | 2.9 km || 
|-id=812 bgcolor=#d6d6d6
| 563812 ||  || — || November 26, 2014 || Haleakala || Pan-STARRS ||  || align=right | 3.0 km || 
|-id=813 bgcolor=#d6d6d6
| 563813 ||  || — || November 21, 2009 || Kitt Peak || Spacewatch ||  || align=right | 2.9 km || 
|-id=814 bgcolor=#E9E9E9
| 563814 ||  || — || February 3, 2016 || Haleakala || Pan-STARRS ||  || align=right | 1.1 km || 
|-id=815 bgcolor=#d6d6d6
| 563815 ||  || — || February 3, 2016 || Haleakala || Pan-STARRS ||  || align=right | 3.2 km || 
|-id=816 bgcolor=#E9E9E9
| 563816 ||  || — || November 4, 2013 || Mount Lemmon || Mount Lemmon Survey ||  || align=right | 1.9 km || 
|-id=817 bgcolor=#d6d6d6
| 563817 ||  || — || December 15, 2010 || Mount Lemmon || Mount Lemmon Survey ||  || align=right | 3.5 km || 
|-id=818 bgcolor=#d6d6d6
| 563818 ||  || — || December 23, 2008 || Dauban || C. Rinner, F. Kugel ||  || align=right | 3.2 km || 
|-id=819 bgcolor=#E9E9E9
| 563819 ||  || — || October 1, 2005 || Kitt Peak || Spacewatch ||  || align=right | 2.3 km || 
|-id=820 bgcolor=#fefefe
| 563820 ||  || — || September 26, 2009 || Zadko || M. Todd || H || align=right data-sort-value="0.70" | 700 m || 
|-id=821 bgcolor=#d6d6d6
| 563821 ||  || — || March 29, 2011 || Mount Lemmon || Mount Lemmon Survey ||  || align=right | 2.3 km || 
|-id=822 bgcolor=#d6d6d6
| 563822 ||  || — || October 23, 2003 || Kitt Peak || Spacewatch ||  || align=right | 2.8 km || 
|-id=823 bgcolor=#d6d6d6
| 563823 ||  || — || March 9, 2011 || Mount Lemmon || Mount Lemmon Survey ||  || align=right | 2.3 km || 
|-id=824 bgcolor=#d6d6d6
| 563824 ||  || — || November 22, 2014 || Mount Lemmon || Mount Lemmon Survey ||  || align=right | 2.4 km || 
|-id=825 bgcolor=#E9E9E9
| 563825 ||  || — || November 26, 2014 || Haleakala || Pan-STARRS ||  || align=right | 1.0 km || 
|-id=826 bgcolor=#d6d6d6
| 563826 ||  || — || October 5, 2014 || Mount Lemmon || Mount Lemmon Survey ||  || align=right | 2.4 km || 
|-id=827 bgcolor=#d6d6d6
| 563827 ||  || — || November 17, 2014 || Palomar || Pan-STARRS ||  || align=right | 3.2 km || 
|-id=828 bgcolor=#E9E9E9
| 563828 ||  || — || January 5, 2003 || Kitt Peak || I. dell'Antonio, D. Loomba ||  || align=right | 1.5 km || 
|-id=829 bgcolor=#d6d6d6
| 563829 ||  || — || December 18, 2004 || Kitt Peak || Spacewatch ||  || align=right | 2.9 km || 
|-id=830 bgcolor=#d6d6d6
| 563830 ||  || — || April 23, 2012 || Kitt Peak || Spacewatch ||  || align=right | 2.3 km || 
|-id=831 bgcolor=#d6d6d6
| 563831 ||  || — || March 26, 2011 || Mount Lemmon || Mount Lemmon Survey ||  || align=right | 2.5 km || 
|-id=832 bgcolor=#d6d6d6
| 563832 ||  || — || October 20, 2014 || Kitt Peak || Spacewatch ||  || align=right | 2.3 km || 
|-id=833 bgcolor=#E9E9E9
| 563833 ||  || — || November 23, 2014 || Haleakala || Pan-STARRS ||  || align=right | 1.3 km || 
|-id=834 bgcolor=#d6d6d6
| 563834 ||  || — || November 19, 2014 || Mount Lemmon || Mount Lemmon Survey ||  || align=right | 2.4 km || 
|-id=835 bgcolor=#E9E9E9
| 563835 ||  || — || October 18, 2009 || Mount Lemmon || Mount Lemmon Survey ||  || align=right | 2.4 km || 
|-id=836 bgcolor=#E9E9E9
| 563836 ||  || — || January 30, 2011 || Mayhill-ISON || L. Elenin ||  || align=right | 2.4 km || 
|-id=837 bgcolor=#E9E9E9
| 563837 ||  || — || March 7, 2016 || Haleakala || Pan-STARRS ||  || align=right | 1.8 km || 
|-id=838 bgcolor=#E9E9E9
| 563838 ||  || — || September 15, 2004 || Kitt Peak || Spacewatch || AST || align=right | 1.6 km || 
|-id=839 bgcolor=#d6d6d6
| 563839 ||  || — || September 29, 2003 || Kitt Peak || Spacewatch || KOR || align=right | 1.7 km || 
|-id=840 bgcolor=#d6d6d6
| 563840 ||  || — || November 12, 2014 || Haleakala || Pan-STARRS ||  || align=right | 2.2 km || 
|-id=841 bgcolor=#E9E9E9
| 563841 ||  || — || February 13, 2011 || Mount Lemmon || Mount Lemmon Survey ||  || align=right | 2.4 km || 
|-id=842 bgcolor=#E9E9E9
| 563842 ||  || — || March 24, 2003 || Kitt Peak || Spacewatch ||  || align=right | 1.8 km || 
|-id=843 bgcolor=#d6d6d6
| 563843 ||  || — || February 7, 2006 || Catalina || CSS ||  || align=right | 1.5 km || 
|-id=844 bgcolor=#E9E9E9
| 563844 ||  || — || December 14, 2010 || Mount Lemmon || Mount Lemmon Survey ||  || align=right | 1.2 km || 
|-id=845 bgcolor=#d6d6d6
| 563845 ||  || — || January 7, 2006 || Kitt Peak || Spacewatch ||  || align=right | 1.7 km || 
|-id=846 bgcolor=#d6d6d6
| 563846 ||  || — || January 22, 2006 || Mount Lemmon || Mount Lemmon Survey ||  || align=right | 2.2 km || 
|-id=847 bgcolor=#E9E9E9
| 563847 ||  || — || December 9, 2015 || Haleakala || Pan-STARRS ||  || align=right | 1.9 km || 
|-id=848 bgcolor=#d6d6d6
| 563848 ||  || — || November 18, 2009 || Kitt Peak || Spacewatch ||  || align=right | 2.1 km || 
|-id=849 bgcolor=#E9E9E9
| 563849 ||  || — || September 29, 2005 || Kitt Peak || Spacewatch ||  || align=right | 1.3 km || 
|-id=850 bgcolor=#E9E9E9
| 563850 ||  || — || March 26, 2007 || Mount Lemmon || Mount Lemmon Survey ||  || align=right | 1.8 km || 
|-id=851 bgcolor=#E9E9E9
| 563851 ||  || — || December 21, 2006 || Kitt Peak || L. H. Wasserman ||  || align=right | 1.4 km || 
|-id=852 bgcolor=#E9E9E9
| 563852 ||  || — || March 14, 2007 || Mount Lemmon || Mount Lemmon Survey ||  || align=right | 2.3 km || 
|-id=853 bgcolor=#E9E9E9
| 563853 ||  || — || January 8, 2011 || Mayhill || N. Falla ||  || align=right | 2.9 km || 
|-id=854 bgcolor=#d6d6d6
| 563854 ||  || — || January 27, 2011 || Kitt Peak || Spacewatch ||  || align=right | 2.6 km || 
|-id=855 bgcolor=#E9E9E9
| 563855 ||  || — || September 30, 2005 || Mount Lemmon || Mount Lemmon Survey ||  || align=right | 1.3 km || 
|-id=856 bgcolor=#E9E9E9
| 563856 ||  || — || October 10, 2010 || Mount Lemmon || Mount Lemmon Survey ||  || align=right | 1.7 km || 
|-id=857 bgcolor=#E9E9E9
| 563857 ||  || — || January 2, 2006 || Kitt Peak || Mount Lemmon Survey ||  || align=right | 2.0 km || 
|-id=858 bgcolor=#d6d6d6
| 563858 ||  || — || October 9, 2008 || Mount Lemmon || Mount Lemmon Survey || EOS || align=right | 1.4 km || 
|-id=859 bgcolor=#E9E9E9
| 563859 ||  || — || March 10, 2007 || Mount Lemmon || Mount Lemmon Survey ||  || align=right | 1.5 km || 
|-id=860 bgcolor=#d6d6d6
| 563860 ||  || — || August 14, 2013 || Haleakala || Pan-STARRS ||  || align=right | 2.5 km || 
|-id=861 bgcolor=#fefefe
| 563861 ||  || — || April 15, 2013 || Haleakala || Pan-STARRS ||  || align=right data-sort-value="0.45" | 450 m || 
|-id=862 bgcolor=#fefefe
| 563862 ||  || — || May 14, 2005 || Mount Lemmon || Mount Lemmon Survey ||  || align=right data-sort-value="0.57" | 570 m || 
|-id=863 bgcolor=#d6d6d6
| 563863 ||  || — || August 15, 2013 || Haleakala || Pan-STARRS ||  || align=right | 1.8 km || 
|-id=864 bgcolor=#E9E9E9
| 563864 ||  || — || March 28, 2012 || Mount Lemmon || Mount Lemmon Survey ||  || align=right | 1.1 km || 
|-id=865 bgcolor=#d6d6d6
| 563865 ||  || — || September 12, 2002 || Mount Lemmon || NEAT ||  || align=right | 2.6 km || 
|-id=866 bgcolor=#E9E9E9
| 563866 ||  || — || January 27, 2011 || Mount Lemmon || Mount Lemmon Survey || AGN || align=right data-sort-value="0.94" | 940 m || 
|-id=867 bgcolor=#E9E9E9
| 563867 ||  || — || February 26, 2007 || Mount Lemmon || Mount Lemmon Survey ||  || align=right | 2.2 km || 
|-id=868 bgcolor=#E9E9E9
| 563868 ||  || — || October 28, 2014 || Mount Lemmon || Mount Lemmon Survey ||  || align=right | 1.2 km || 
|-id=869 bgcolor=#E9E9E9
| 563869 ||  || — || September 4, 2008 || Kitt Peak || Spacewatch ||  || align=right | 1.8 km || 
|-id=870 bgcolor=#E9E9E9
| 563870 ||  || — || March 9, 2007 || Kitt Peak || Spacewatch ||  || align=right | 1.3 km || 
|-id=871 bgcolor=#d6d6d6
| 563871 ||  || — || September 15, 2007 || Mount Lemmon || Mount Lemmon Survey ||  || align=right | 2.5 km || 
|-id=872 bgcolor=#d6d6d6
| 563872 ||  || — || September 1, 2013 || Mount Lemmon || Mount Lemmon Survey ||  || align=right | 3.1 km || 
|-id=873 bgcolor=#d6d6d6
| 563873 ||  || — || October 18, 2003 || Apache Point || SDSS Collaboration || KOR || align=right | 1.4 km || 
|-id=874 bgcolor=#d6d6d6
| 563874 ||  || — || April 3, 2011 || Haleakala || Pan-STARRS ||  || align=right | 3.1 km || 
|-id=875 bgcolor=#d6d6d6
| 563875 ||  || — || September 25, 2013 || Catalina || CSS ||  || align=right | 2.6 km || 
|-id=876 bgcolor=#E9E9E9
| 563876 ||  || — || April 22, 2007 || Kitt Peak || Spacewatch ||  || align=right | 1.8 km || 
|-id=877 bgcolor=#d6d6d6
| 563877 ||  || — || February 10, 2016 || Haleakala || Pan-STARRS ||  || align=right | 1.9 km || 
|-id=878 bgcolor=#d6d6d6
| 563878 ||  || — || August 21, 2008 || Kitt Peak || Spacewatch ||  || align=right | 2.9 km || 
|-id=879 bgcolor=#d6d6d6
| 563879 ||  || — || March 10, 2016 || Mount Lemmon || Mount Lemmon Survey ||  || align=right | 2.7 km || 
|-id=880 bgcolor=#d6d6d6
| 563880 ||  || — || October 29, 2008 || Mount Lemmon || Mount Lemmon Survey || NAE || align=right | 1.8 km || 
|-id=881 bgcolor=#d6d6d6
| 563881 ||  || — || August 28, 2002 || Palomar || NEAT ||  || align=right | 3.5 km || 
|-id=882 bgcolor=#d6d6d6
| 563882 ||  || — || February 25, 2006 || Mount Lemmon || Mount Lemmon Survey ||  || align=right | 2.1 km || 
|-id=883 bgcolor=#E9E9E9
| 563883 ||  || — || February 5, 2011 || Haleakala || Pan-STARRS ||  || align=right | 1.5 km || 
|-id=884 bgcolor=#d6d6d6
| 563884 ||  || — || September 18, 2003 || Kitt Peak || Spacewatch ||  || align=right | 2.1 km || 
|-id=885 bgcolor=#E9E9E9
| 563885 ||  || — || September 9, 2013 || Haleakala || Pan-STARRS ||  || align=right | 2.0 km || 
|-id=886 bgcolor=#E9E9E9
| 563886 ||  || — || April 15, 2007 || Kitt Peak || Spacewatch ||  || align=right | 2.0 km || 
|-id=887 bgcolor=#d6d6d6
| 563887 ||  || — || September 19, 2008 || Kitt Peak || Spacewatch ||  || align=right | 2.1 km || 
|-id=888 bgcolor=#d6d6d6
| 563888 ||  || — || October 4, 2007 || Kitt Peak || Spacewatch ||  || align=right | 3.3 km || 
|-id=889 bgcolor=#d6d6d6
| 563889 ||  || — || March 13, 2005 || Kitt Peak || Spacewatch ||  || align=right | 2.4 km || 
|-id=890 bgcolor=#E9E9E9
| 563890 ||  || — || March 27, 2012 || Kitt Peak || Spacewatch ||  || align=right data-sort-value="0.82" | 820 m || 
|-id=891 bgcolor=#E9E9E9
| 563891 ||  || — || March 10, 2016 || Haleakala || Pan-STARRS ||  || align=right | 1.9 km || 
|-id=892 bgcolor=#E9E9E9
| 563892 ||  || — || April 9, 2003 || Palomar || NEAT || JUN || align=right | 1.0 km || 
|-id=893 bgcolor=#E9E9E9
| 563893 ||  || — || August 14, 2013 || Haleakala || Pan-STARRS ||  || align=right | 2.2 km || 
|-id=894 bgcolor=#E9E9E9
| 563894 ||  || — || March 16, 2007 || Mount Lemmon || Mount Lemmon Survey ||  || align=right | 2.5 km || 
|-id=895 bgcolor=#d6d6d6
| 563895 ||  || — || January 17, 2015 || Mount Lemmon || Mount Lemmon Survey ||  || align=right | 2.8 km || 
|-id=896 bgcolor=#d6d6d6
| 563896 ||  || — || September 5, 2013 || Kitt Peak || Spacewatch ||  || align=right | 2.7 km || 
|-id=897 bgcolor=#d6d6d6
| 563897 ||  || — || March 10, 2016 || Haleakala || Pan-STARRS ||  || align=right | 2.4 km || 
|-id=898 bgcolor=#d6d6d6
| 563898 ||  || — || May 10, 2005 || Cerro Tololo || M. W. Buie, L. H. Wasserman ||  || align=right | 2.5 km || 
|-id=899 bgcolor=#d6d6d6
| 563899 ||  || — || January 17, 2004 || Palomar || NEAT ||  || align=right | 3.2 km || 
|-id=900 bgcolor=#E9E9E9
| 563900 ||  || — || August 15, 2013 || Haleakala || Pan-STARRS ||  || align=right | 2.0 km || 
|}

563901–564000 

|-bgcolor=#d6d6d6
| 563901 ||  || — || September 24, 2008 || Mount Lemmon || Mount Lemmon Survey ||  || align=right | 2.6 km || 
|-id=902 bgcolor=#d6d6d6
| 563902 ||  || — || September 4, 2013 || Mount Lemmon || Mount Lemmon Survey ||  || align=right | 2.7 km || 
|-id=903 bgcolor=#d6d6d6
| 563903 ||  || — || November 21, 2009 || Mount Lemmon || Mount Lemmon Survey ||  || align=right | 2.3 km || 
|-id=904 bgcolor=#E9E9E9
| 563904 ||  || — || February 13, 2011 || Mount Lemmon || Mount Lemmon Survey ||  || align=right | 1.7 km || 
|-id=905 bgcolor=#E9E9E9
| 563905 ||  || — || October 15, 2001 || Palomar || NEAT || ADE || align=right | 1.9 km || 
|-id=906 bgcolor=#E9E9E9
| 563906 ||  || — || November 7, 2010 || Catalina || CSS ||  || align=right | 1.9 km || 
|-id=907 bgcolor=#d6d6d6
| 563907 ||  || — || March 4, 2006 || Kitt Peak || Spacewatch ||  || align=right | 2.0 km || 
|-id=908 bgcolor=#E9E9E9
| 563908 ||  || — || January 27, 2007 || Kitt Peak || Spacewatch ||  || align=right | 1.3 km || 
|-id=909 bgcolor=#E9E9E9
| 563909 ||  || — || May 17, 2012 || Mount Lemmon || Mount Lemmon Survey || MRX || align=right data-sort-value="0.86" | 860 m || 
|-id=910 bgcolor=#E9E9E9
| 563910 ||  || — || February 10, 2011 || Mount Lemmon || Mount Lemmon Survey ||  || align=right | 1.6 km || 
|-id=911 bgcolor=#E9E9E9
| 563911 ||  || — || December 8, 2010 || Mount Lemmon || Mount Lemmon Survey ||  || align=right | 1.4 km || 
|-id=912 bgcolor=#E9E9E9
| 563912 ||  || — || September 29, 2009 || Mount Lemmon || Mount Lemmon Survey ||  || align=right | 1.1 km || 
|-id=913 bgcolor=#d6d6d6
| 563913 ||  || — || September 6, 2008 || Mount Lemmon || Mount Lemmon Survey ||  || align=right | 2.0 km || 
|-id=914 bgcolor=#E9E9E9
| 563914 ||  || — || March 26, 2007 || Mount Lemmon || Mount Lemmon Survey ||  || align=right | 1.6 km || 
|-id=915 bgcolor=#E9E9E9
| 563915 ||  || — || March 6, 2011 || Mount Lemmon || Mount Lemmon Survey || AGN || align=right data-sort-value="0.91" | 910 m || 
|-id=916 bgcolor=#d6d6d6
| 563916 ||  || — || March 16, 2005 || Mount Lemmon || Mount Lemmon Survey ||  || align=right | 2.6 km || 
|-id=917 bgcolor=#d6d6d6
| 563917 ||  || — || September 6, 2008 || Mount Lemmon || Mount Lemmon Survey ||  || align=right | 1.9 km || 
|-id=918 bgcolor=#d6d6d6
| 563918 ||  || — || March 11, 2005 || Kitt Peak || Spacewatch ||  || align=right | 3.5 km || 
|-id=919 bgcolor=#E9E9E9
| 563919 ||  || — || February 10, 2011 || Mount Lemmon || Mount Lemmon Survey ||  || align=right | 1.5 km || 
|-id=920 bgcolor=#d6d6d6
| 563920 ||  || — || September 5, 2013 || Kitt Peak || Spacewatch ||  || align=right | 2.6 km || 
|-id=921 bgcolor=#E9E9E9
| 563921 ||  || — || August 6, 2005 || Palomar || NEAT ||  || align=right | 1.1 km || 
|-id=922 bgcolor=#d6d6d6
| 563922 ||  || — || August 7, 2008 || Kitt Peak || Spacewatch ||  || align=right | 2.3 km || 
|-id=923 bgcolor=#d6d6d6
| 563923 ||  || — || November 29, 1999 || Kitt Peak || Spacewatch ||  || align=right | 1.7 km || 
|-id=924 bgcolor=#E9E9E9
| 563924 ||  || — || April 25, 2007 || Kitt Peak || Spacewatch ||  || align=right | 1.6 km || 
|-id=925 bgcolor=#E9E9E9
| 563925 ||  || — || April 27, 2012 || Mount Lemmon || Mount Lemmon Survey ||  || align=right | 2.3 km || 
|-id=926 bgcolor=#E9E9E9
| 563926 ||  || — || March 14, 2012 || Haleakala || Pan-STARRS ||  || align=right | 1.6 km || 
|-id=927 bgcolor=#E9E9E9
| 563927 ||  || — || June 20, 2001 || Haleakala || AMOS ||  || align=right | 2.0 km || 
|-id=928 bgcolor=#d6d6d6
| 563928 ||  || — || November 11, 2004 || Kitt Peak || Kitt Peak Obs. ||  || align=right | 1.7 km || 
|-id=929 bgcolor=#d6d6d6
| 563929 ||  || — || September 5, 2008 || Kitt Peak || Spacewatch ||  || align=right | 2.1 km || 
|-id=930 bgcolor=#d6d6d6
| 563930 ||  || — || May 6, 2006 || Kitt Peak || Spacewatch ||  || align=right | 2.2 km || 
|-id=931 bgcolor=#d6d6d6
| 563931 ||  || — || November 20, 2003 || Socorro || LINEAR ||  || align=right | 2.7 km || 
|-id=932 bgcolor=#d6d6d6
| 563932 ||  || — || April 2, 2005 || Mount Lemmon || Mount Lemmon Survey ||  || align=right | 2.4 km || 
|-id=933 bgcolor=#E9E9E9
| 563933 ||  || — || August 22, 2004 || Kitt Peak || Spacewatch ||  || align=right | 1.3 km || 
|-id=934 bgcolor=#d6d6d6
| 563934 ||  || — || September 6, 2008 || Kitt Peak || Spacewatch ||  || align=right | 1.8 km || 
|-id=935 bgcolor=#d6d6d6
| 563935 ||  || — || February 15, 2010 || Mount Lemmon || Mount Lemmon Survey ||  || align=right | 2.2 km || 
|-id=936 bgcolor=#d6d6d6
| 563936 ||  || — || November 27, 2014 || Haleakala || Pan-STARRS ||  || align=right | 2.0 km || 
|-id=937 bgcolor=#d6d6d6
| 563937 ||  || — || August 19, 2006 || Anderson Mesa || LONEOS ||  || align=right | 2.1 km || 
|-id=938 bgcolor=#E9E9E9
| 563938 ||  || — || May 8, 2008 || Kitt Peak || Spacewatch ||  || align=right | 1.7 km || 
|-id=939 bgcolor=#E9E9E9
| 563939 ||  || — || May 26, 2008 || Kitt Peak || Spacewatch ||  || align=right | 1.6 km || 
|-id=940 bgcolor=#d6d6d6
| 563940 ||  || — || March 12, 2016 || Haleakala || Pan-STARRS ||  || align=right | 2.8 km || 
|-id=941 bgcolor=#E9E9E9
| 563941 ||  || — || October 27, 2009 || Kitt Peak || Spacewatch ||  || align=right | 1.8 km || 
|-id=942 bgcolor=#d6d6d6
| 563942 ||  || — || February 26, 2011 || Mount Lemmon || Mount Lemmon Survey ||  || align=right | 2.1 km || 
|-id=943 bgcolor=#E9E9E9
| 563943 ||  || — || September 6, 2013 || Mount Lemmon || Mount Lemmon Survey ||  || align=right | 2.2 km || 
|-id=944 bgcolor=#E9E9E9
| 563944 ||  || — || August 28, 2009 || Kitt Peak || Spacewatch ||  || align=right | 1.4 km || 
|-id=945 bgcolor=#E9E9E9
| 563945 ||  || — || April 21, 2012 || Catalina || CSS ||  || align=right | 1.9 km || 
|-id=946 bgcolor=#E9E9E9
| 563946 ||  || — || November 25, 2005 || Kitt Peak || Spacewatch ||  || align=right | 2.7 km || 
|-id=947 bgcolor=#d6d6d6
| 563947 ||  || — || October 13, 2013 || Kitt Peak || Spacewatch ||  || align=right | 2.4 km || 
|-id=948 bgcolor=#E9E9E9
| 563948 ||  || — || January 8, 2003 || Socorro || LINEAR ||  || align=right | 1.6 km || 
|-id=949 bgcolor=#E9E9E9
| 563949 ||  || — || November 26, 2005 || Mount Lemmon || Mount Lemmon Survey ||  || align=right | 1.7 km || 
|-id=950 bgcolor=#d6d6d6
| 563950 ||  || — || September 20, 2008 || Catalina || CSS ||  || align=right | 2.8 km || 
|-id=951 bgcolor=#E9E9E9
| 563951 ||  || — || March 15, 2016 || Haleakala || Pan-STARRS ||  || align=right | 1.4 km || 
|-id=952 bgcolor=#E9E9E9
| 563952 ||  || — || January 23, 2011 || Mount Lemmon || Mount Lemmon Survey ||  || align=right | 1.9 km || 
|-id=953 bgcolor=#E9E9E9
| 563953 ||  || — || April 1, 2008 || Kitt Peak || Spacewatch ||  || align=right | 1.1 km || 
|-id=954 bgcolor=#d6d6d6
| 563954 ||  || — || October 29, 2008 || Mount Lemmon || Mount Lemmon Survey ||  || align=right | 2.6 km || 
|-id=955 bgcolor=#E9E9E9
| 563955 ||  || — || April 2, 2003 || Cerro Tololo || Cerro Tololo Obs. ||  || align=right | 2.2 km || 
|-id=956 bgcolor=#E9E9E9
| 563956 ||  || — || March 29, 2012 || Kitt Peak || Spacewatch ||  || align=right | 1.1 km || 
|-id=957 bgcolor=#d6d6d6
| 563957 ||  || — || October 22, 2014 || Mount Lemmon || Mount Lemmon Survey ||  || align=right | 2.8 km || 
|-id=958 bgcolor=#E9E9E9
| 563958 ||  || — || September 29, 2009 || Kitt Peak || Spacewatch ||  || align=right | 1.5 km || 
|-id=959 bgcolor=#d6d6d6
| 563959 ||  || — || March 28, 2011 || Kitt Peak || Spacewatch ||  || align=right | 3.0 km || 
|-id=960 bgcolor=#E9E9E9
| 563960 ||  || — || April 30, 2003 || Kitt Peak || Spacewatch ||  || align=right | 2.0 km || 
|-id=961 bgcolor=#E9E9E9
| 563961 ||  || — || October 30, 2005 || Mount Lemmon || Mount Lemmon Survey ||  || align=right | 2.5 km || 
|-id=962 bgcolor=#fefefe
| 563962 ||  || — || February 28, 2008 || Kitt Peak || Spacewatch || H || align=right data-sort-value="0.49" | 490 m || 
|-id=963 bgcolor=#fefefe
| 563963 ||  || — || October 31, 2012 || Haleakala || Pan-STARRS || H || align=right data-sort-value="0.59" | 590 m || 
|-id=964 bgcolor=#fefefe
| 563964 ||  || — || September 28, 2009 || Mount Lemmon || Mount Lemmon Survey || H || align=right data-sort-value="0.69" | 690 m || 
|-id=965 bgcolor=#fefefe
| 563965 ||  || — || October 13, 2014 || Mount Lemmon || Mount Lemmon Survey || H || align=right data-sort-value="0.52" | 520 m || 
|-id=966 bgcolor=#fefefe
| 563966 ||  || — || April 21, 2006 || Kitt Peak || Spacewatch || H || align=right data-sort-value="0.43" | 430 m || 
|-id=967 bgcolor=#fefefe
| 563967 ||  || — || March 4, 2016 || Haleakala || Pan-STARRS || H || align=right data-sort-value="0.48" | 480 m || 
|-id=968 bgcolor=#d6d6d6
| 563968 ||  || — || August 8, 2013 || Kitt Peak || Spacewatch ||  || align=right | 1.7 km || 
|-id=969 bgcolor=#d6d6d6
| 563969 ||  || — || September 4, 2008 || Kitt Peak || Spacewatch ||  || align=right | 2.0 km || 
|-id=970 bgcolor=#d6d6d6
| 563970 ||  || — || November 16, 2006 || Mount Lemmon || Mount Lemmon Survey ||  || align=right | 2.3 km || 
|-id=971 bgcolor=#d6d6d6
| 563971 ||  || — || September 16, 2006 || Catalina || CSS ||  || align=right | 2.7 km || 
|-id=972 bgcolor=#d6d6d6
| 563972 ||  || — || January 20, 2015 || Mount Lemmon || Mount Lemmon Survey ||  || align=right | 2.2 km || 
|-id=973 bgcolor=#d6d6d6
| 563973 ||  || — || May 11, 2005 || Mount Lemmon || Mount Lemmon Survey ||  || align=right | 2.8 km || 
|-id=974 bgcolor=#d6d6d6
| 563974 ||  || — || March 13, 2016 || Mount Lemmon || Pan-STARRS ||  || align=right | 1.8 km || 
|-id=975 bgcolor=#d6d6d6
| 563975 ||  || — || March 8, 2005 || Mount Lemmon || Mount Lemmon Survey ||  || align=right | 2.3 km || 
|-id=976 bgcolor=#d6d6d6
| 563976 ||  || — || April 6, 1994 || Kitt Peak || Spacewatch ||  || align=right | 3.2 km || 
|-id=977 bgcolor=#E9E9E9
| 563977 ||  || — || March 4, 2016 || Haleakala || Pan-STARRS ||  || align=right | 1.6 km || 
|-id=978 bgcolor=#d6d6d6
| 563978 ||  || — || March 7, 2016 || Haleakala || Pan-STARRS ||  || align=right | 1.7 km || 
|-id=979 bgcolor=#E9E9E9
| 563979 ||  || — || August 12, 2013 || Haleakala || Pan-STARRS ||  || align=right | 1.7 km || 
|-id=980 bgcolor=#E9E9E9
| 563980 ||  || — || October 23, 2009 || Mount Lemmon || Mount Lemmon Survey ||  || align=right | 1.5 km || 
|-id=981 bgcolor=#d6d6d6
| 563981 ||  || — || April 5, 2011 || Kitt Peak || Spacewatch ||  || align=right | 2.4 km || 
|-id=982 bgcolor=#E9E9E9
| 563982 ||  || — || July 31, 2014 || Haleakala || Pan-STARRS ||  || align=right data-sort-value="0.92" | 920 m || 
|-id=983 bgcolor=#d6d6d6
| 563983 ||  || — || August 23, 2007 || Kitt Peak || Spacewatch ||  || align=right | 2.5 km || 
|-id=984 bgcolor=#d6d6d6
| 563984 ||  || — || January 16, 2015 || Haleakala || Pan-STARRS ||  || align=right | 2.1 km || 
|-id=985 bgcolor=#d6d6d6
| 563985 ||  || — || September 13, 2007 || Kitt Peak || Spacewatch ||  || align=right | 2.4 km || 
|-id=986 bgcolor=#d6d6d6
| 563986 ||  || — || January 14, 2015 || Haleakala || Pan-STARRS ||  || align=right | 2.2 km || 
|-id=987 bgcolor=#d6d6d6
| 563987 ||  || — || September 12, 2007 || Mount Lemmon || Mount Lemmon Survey ||  || align=right | 2.3 km || 
|-id=988 bgcolor=#d6d6d6
| 563988 ||  || — || April 2, 2011 || Kitt Peak || Spacewatch ||  || align=right | 2.9 km || 
|-id=989 bgcolor=#d6d6d6
| 563989 ||  || — || February 19, 2010 || Mount Lemmon || Mount Lemmon Survey ||  || align=right | 2.6 km || 
|-id=990 bgcolor=#d6d6d6
| 563990 ||  || — || November 3, 2007 || Mount Lemmon || Mount Lemmon Survey ||  || align=right | 2.8 km || 
|-id=991 bgcolor=#E9E9E9
| 563991 ||  || — || March 14, 2016 || Mount Lemmon || Mount Lemmon Survey ||  || align=right | 1.8 km || 
|-id=992 bgcolor=#d6d6d6
| 563992 ||  || — || December 11, 1998 || Kitt Peak || Spacewatch ||  || align=right | 2.9 km || 
|-id=993 bgcolor=#fefefe
| 563993 ||  || — || February 28, 2012 || Haleakala || Pan-STARRS ||  || align=right data-sort-value="0.57" | 570 m || 
|-id=994 bgcolor=#d6d6d6
| 563994 ||  || — || December 3, 2014 || Haleakala || Pan-STARRS ||  || align=right | 1.9 km || 
|-id=995 bgcolor=#d6d6d6
| 563995 ||  || — || December 24, 2014 || Mount Lemmon || Mount Lemmon Survey ||  || align=right | 2.0 km || 
|-id=996 bgcolor=#E9E9E9
| 563996 ||  || — || October 3, 1999 || Kitt Peak || Spacewatch ||  || align=right | 1.6 km || 
|-id=997 bgcolor=#E9E9E9
| 563997 ||  || — || September 19, 2009 || Kitt Peak || Spacewatch ||  || align=right | 1.7 km || 
|-id=998 bgcolor=#E9E9E9
| 563998 ||  || — || September 27, 2009 || Mount Lemmon || Mount Lemmon Survey ||  || align=right | 1.3 km || 
|-id=999 bgcolor=#fefefe
| 563999 ||  || — || November 24, 2011 || Haleakala || Pan-STARRS ||  || align=right data-sort-value="0.56" | 560 m || 
|-id=000 bgcolor=#E9E9E9
| 564000 ||  || — || October 19, 2000 || Kitt Peak || Spacewatch ||  || align=right | 1.5 km || 
|}

References

External links 
 Discovery Circumstances: Numbered Minor Planets (560001)–(565000) (IAU Minor Planet Center)

0563